= Neighbourhoods in Brussels =

There are several neighbourhoods in Brussels, Belgium. Their names and borders are not officially defined, and they might vary occasionally. The districts listed by the Brussels-Capital Region have a statistical purpose, and therefore do not always correspond to the historic municipal districts. In addition, their borders are not necessarily identical according to regional or municipal sources, and may thus overlap.

== City of Brussels ==
=== Pentagon ===
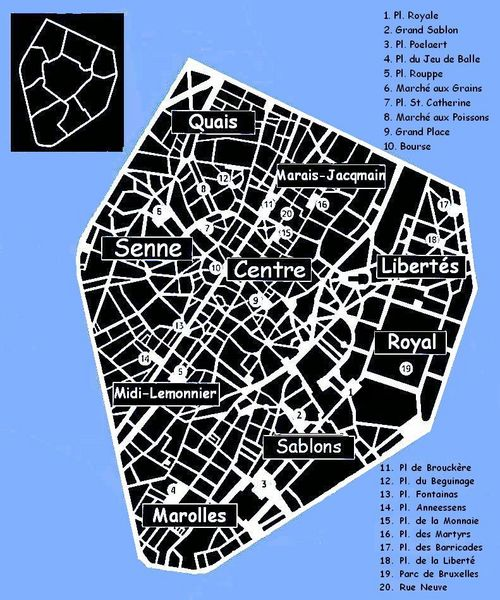
Map of Brussels' Pentagon and its districts (in French)

==== Central Quarter ====
The origins of Brussels can be traced back to the heart of Saint-Géry/Sint-Goriks Island, formed by the river Senne, on which a first keep was built around 979. Nowadays, the neighbourhood around the Halles Saint-Géry/Sint-Gorikshallen, a market hall and cultural centre, is one of the capital's trendiest districts. In this Central Quarter (French: Quartier du Centre, Dutch: Centrumwijk), there are some vestiges of the 13th-century first walls of Brussels, which encompassed the area between the first port on the Senne, the old Romanesque church (later replaced by the Cathedral of St. Michael and St. Gudula in Brabantine Gothic style), and the former ducal palace of Coudenberg in today's Royal Quarter. At the centre of this triangle are the Grand-Place/Grote Markt (Brussels' main square); the Îlot Sacré district, which takes its name from its resistance to demolition projects, itself crossed by the Royal Saint-Hubert Galleries; the Saint-Jacques/Sint-Jacobs district, which welcomed pilgrims on their way to Santiago de Compostela; as well as the Bourse Palace, erected on the site of a former Franciscan convent whose remains have been unearthed. Additionally, Manneken Pis, a fountain containing a small bronze sculpture of a urinating youth, is a tourist attraction and symbol of the city

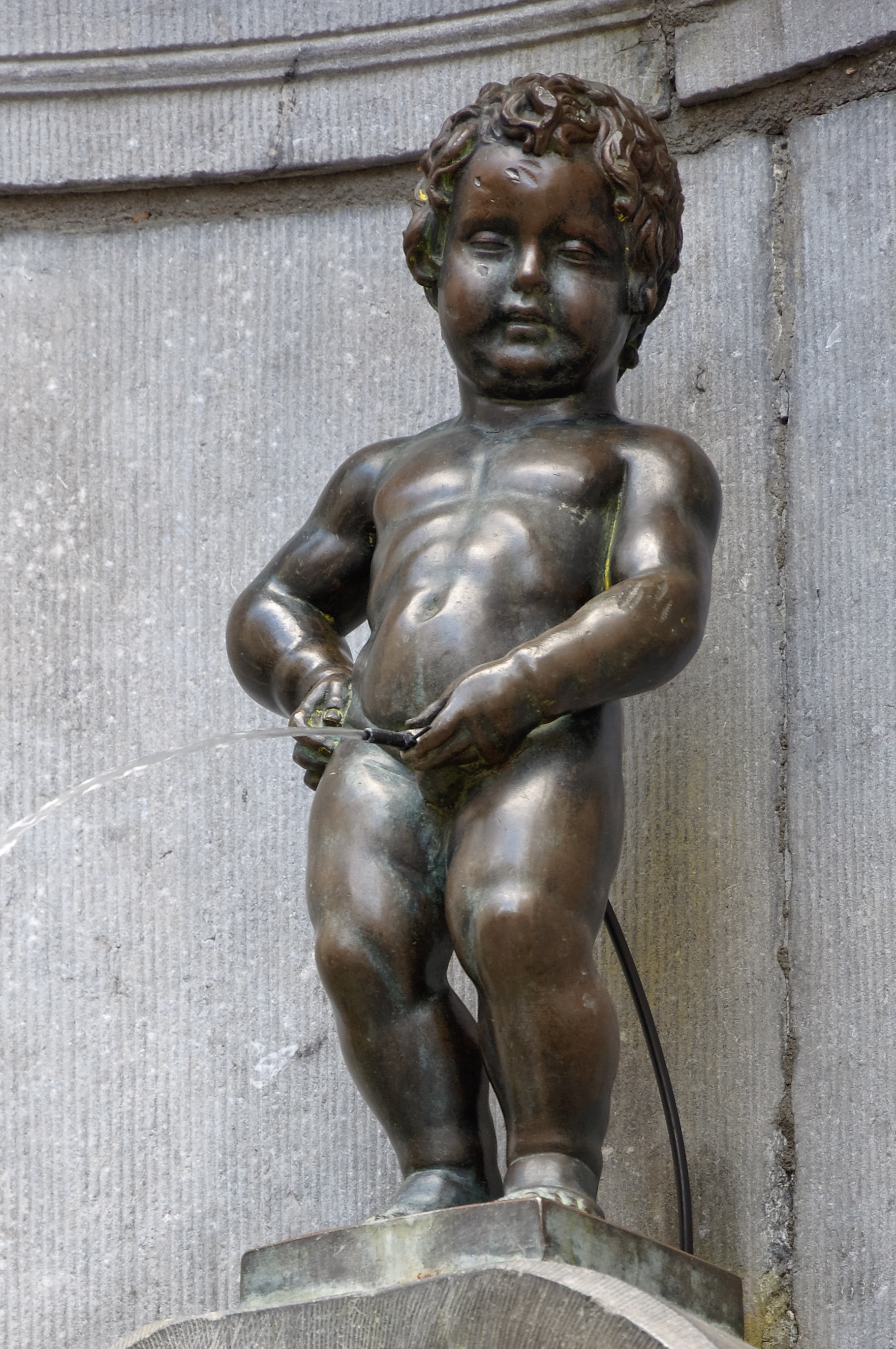
Manneken Pis

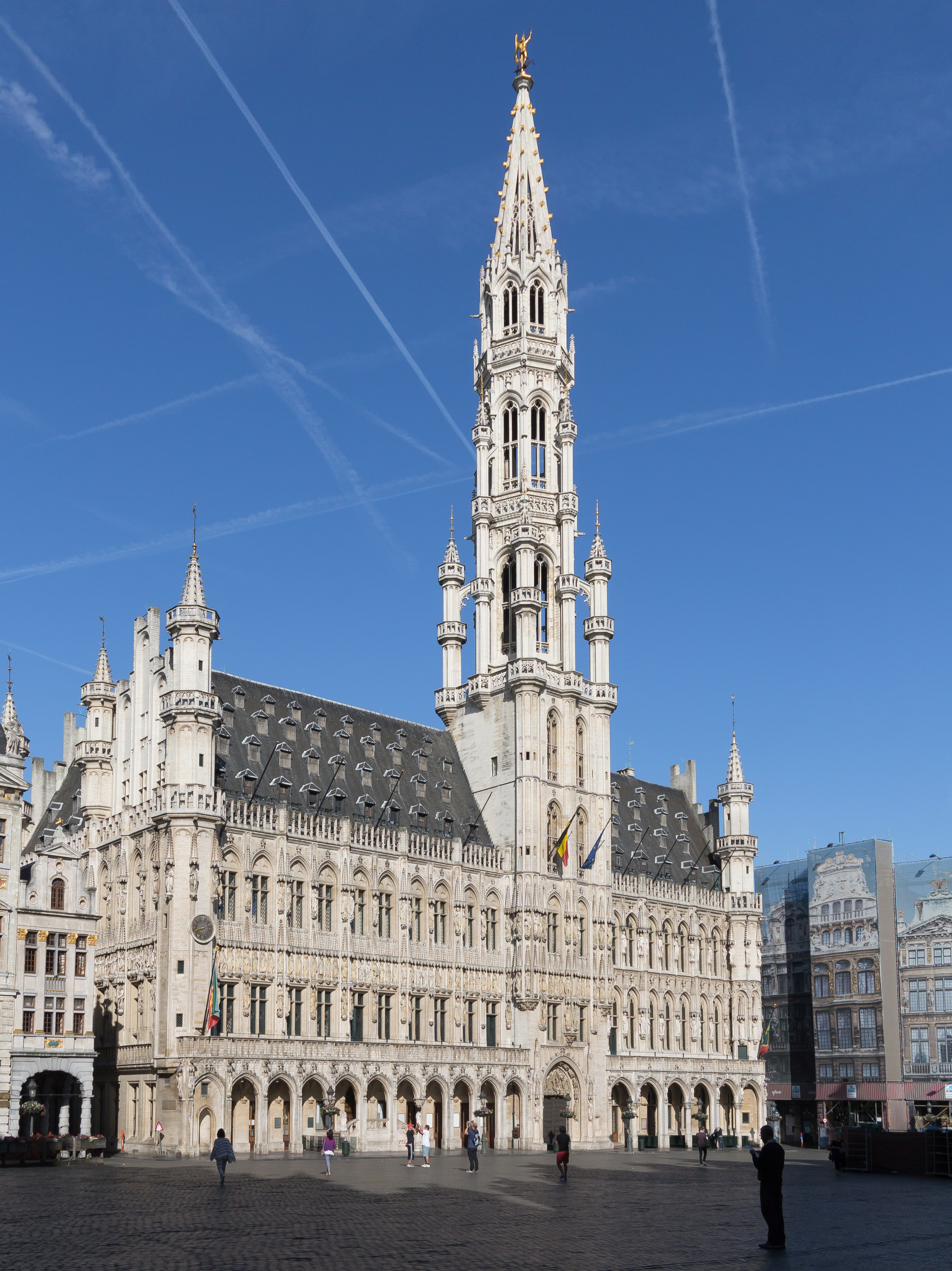
Brussels' Town Hall

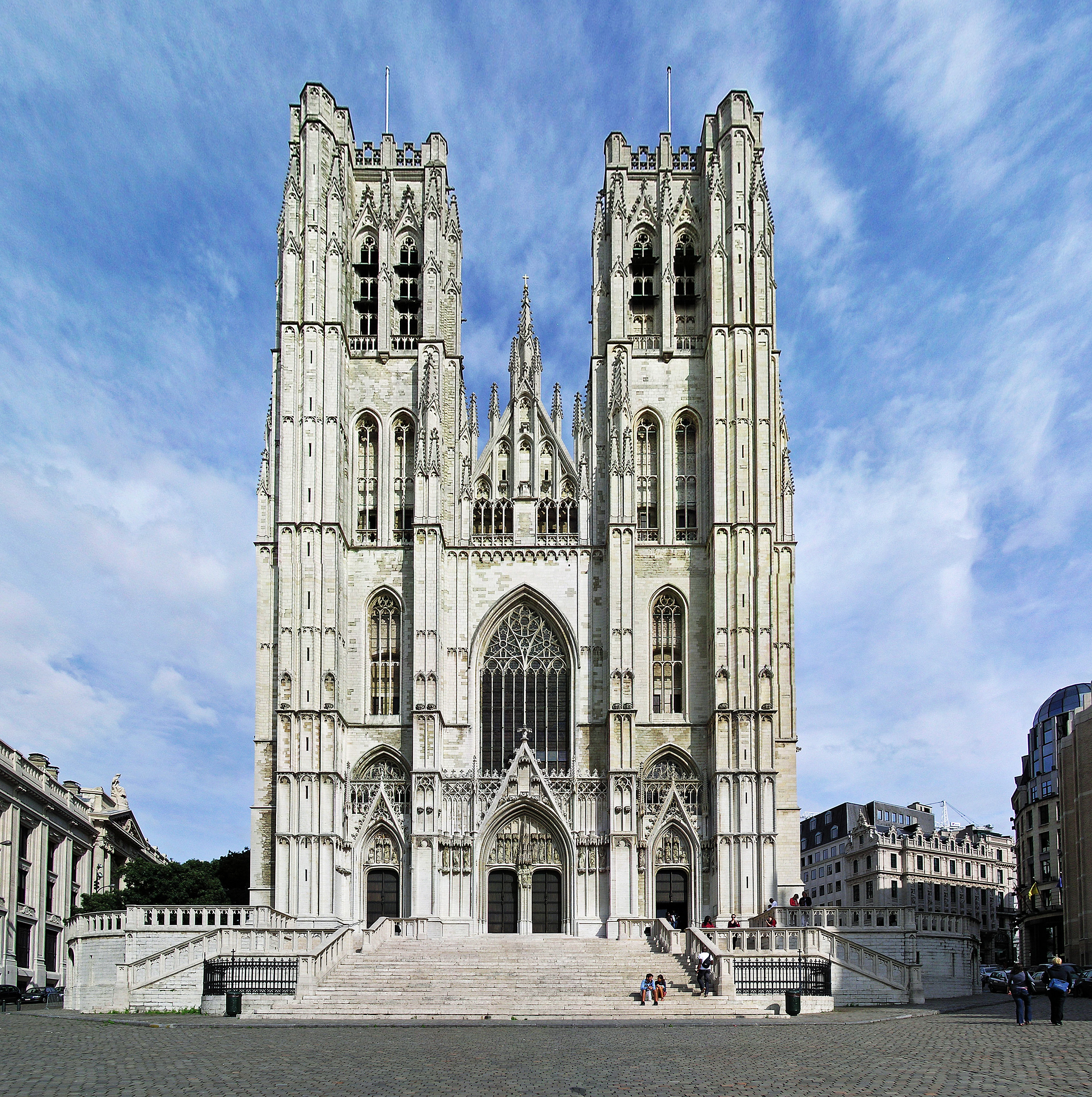
Cathedral of St. Michael and St. Gudula

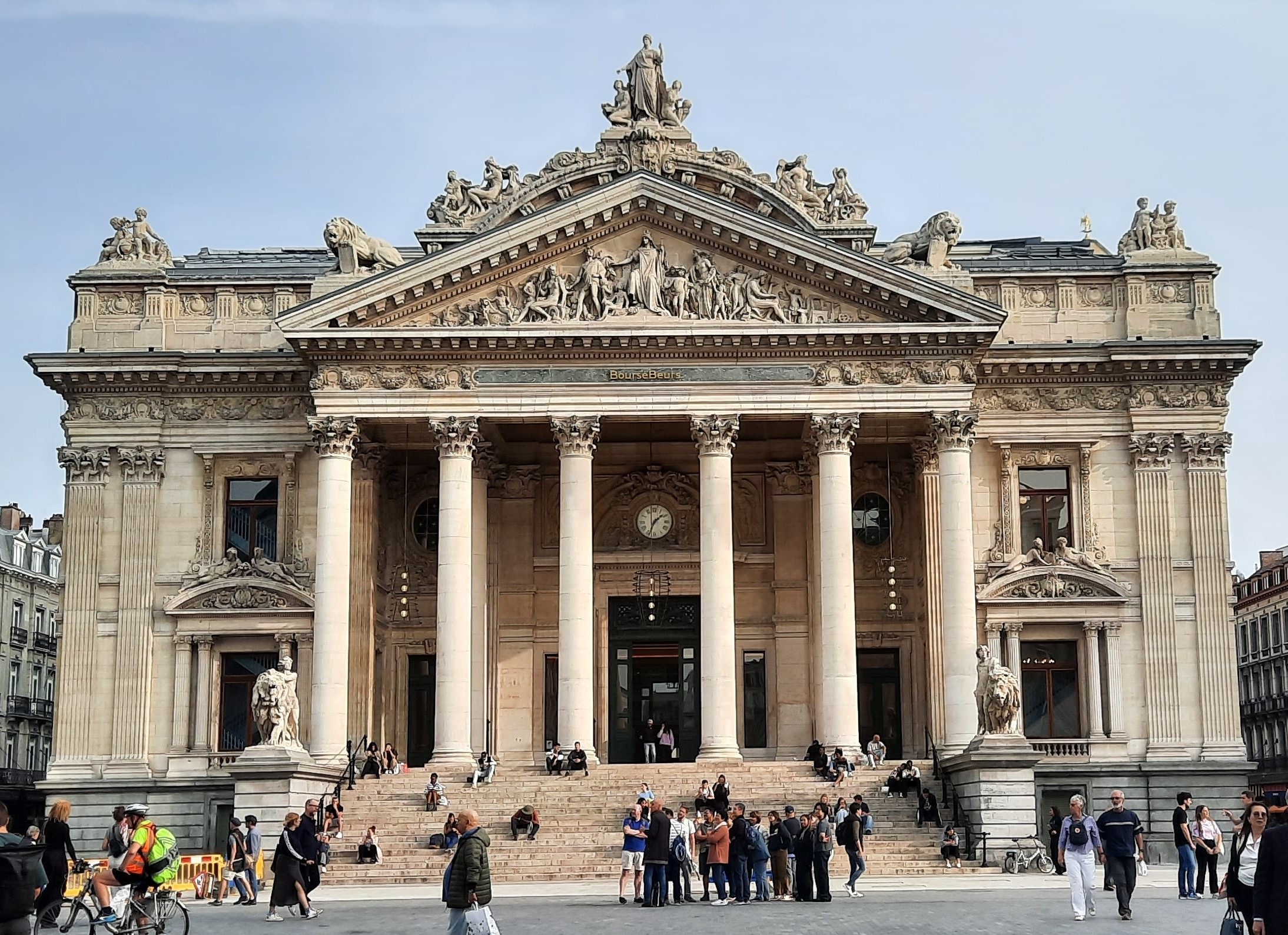
Bourse Palace

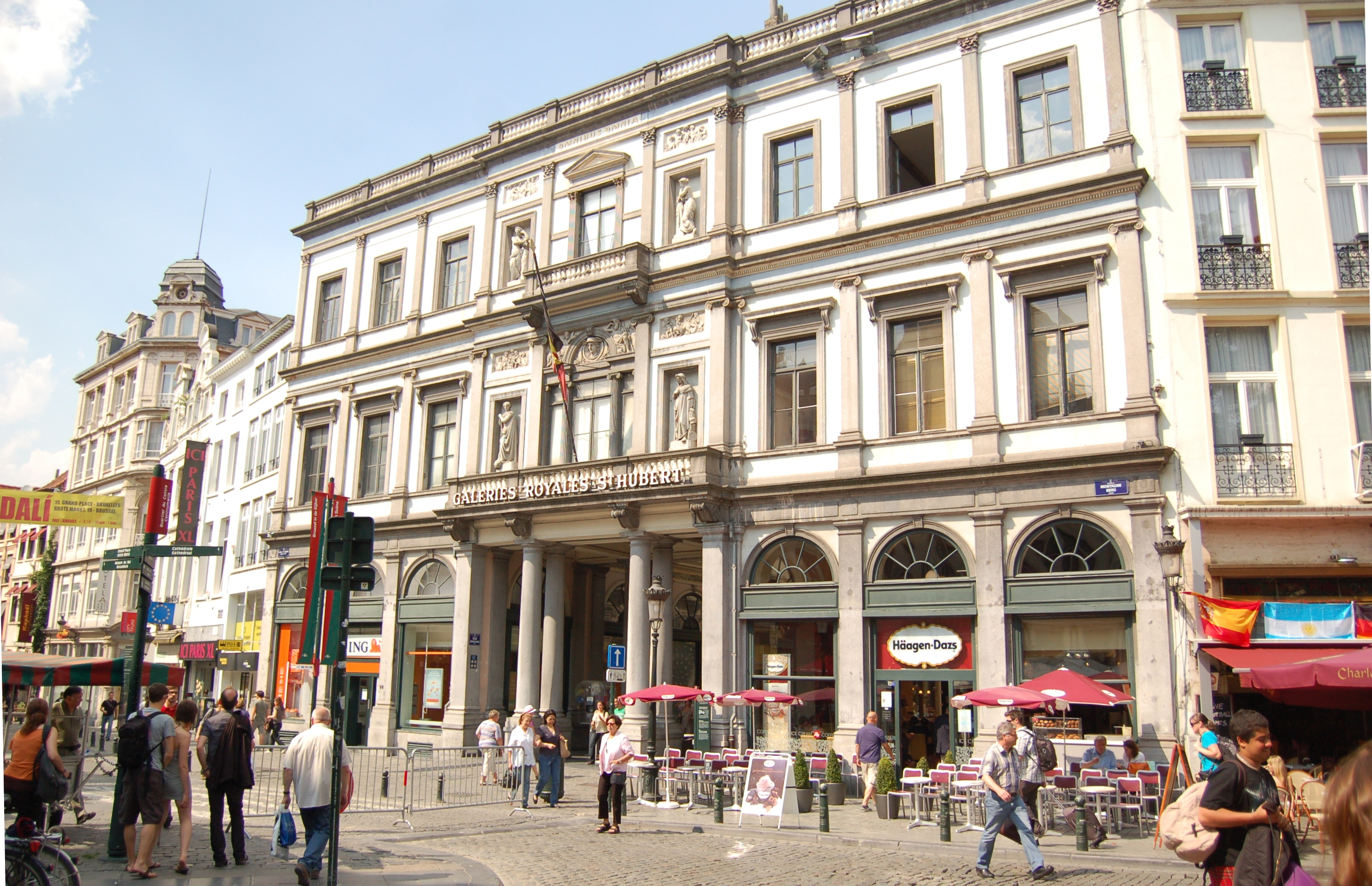
Royal Saint-Hubert Galleries

==== Royal Quarter ====
The Royal Quarter (French: Quartier Royal or Quartier de la Cour, Dutch: Koninklijke Wijk or Koningswijk) is so named because it houses, on the one hand, the Place Royale/Koningsplein ("Royal Square" or "King's Square"), built under Charles-Alexander of Lorraine on the Coudenberg hill, on the site of the former Palace of the Dukes of Brabant, of which certain levels of foundation still exist, and on the other hand, the Royal Palace of Brussels, which faces Brussels Park, on the other side of which is the Belgian House of Parliament (Palace of the Nation). Below the Royal Quarter is Brussels-Central railway station and the Mont des Arts/Kunstberg, home to the Royal Library of Belgium (KBR), the Royal Belgian Film Archive (Cinematek), the Brussels Centre for Fine Arts, the Museum of Cinema, the Musical Instruments Museum (MIM), the BELvue Museum, and the Oldmasters Museum.

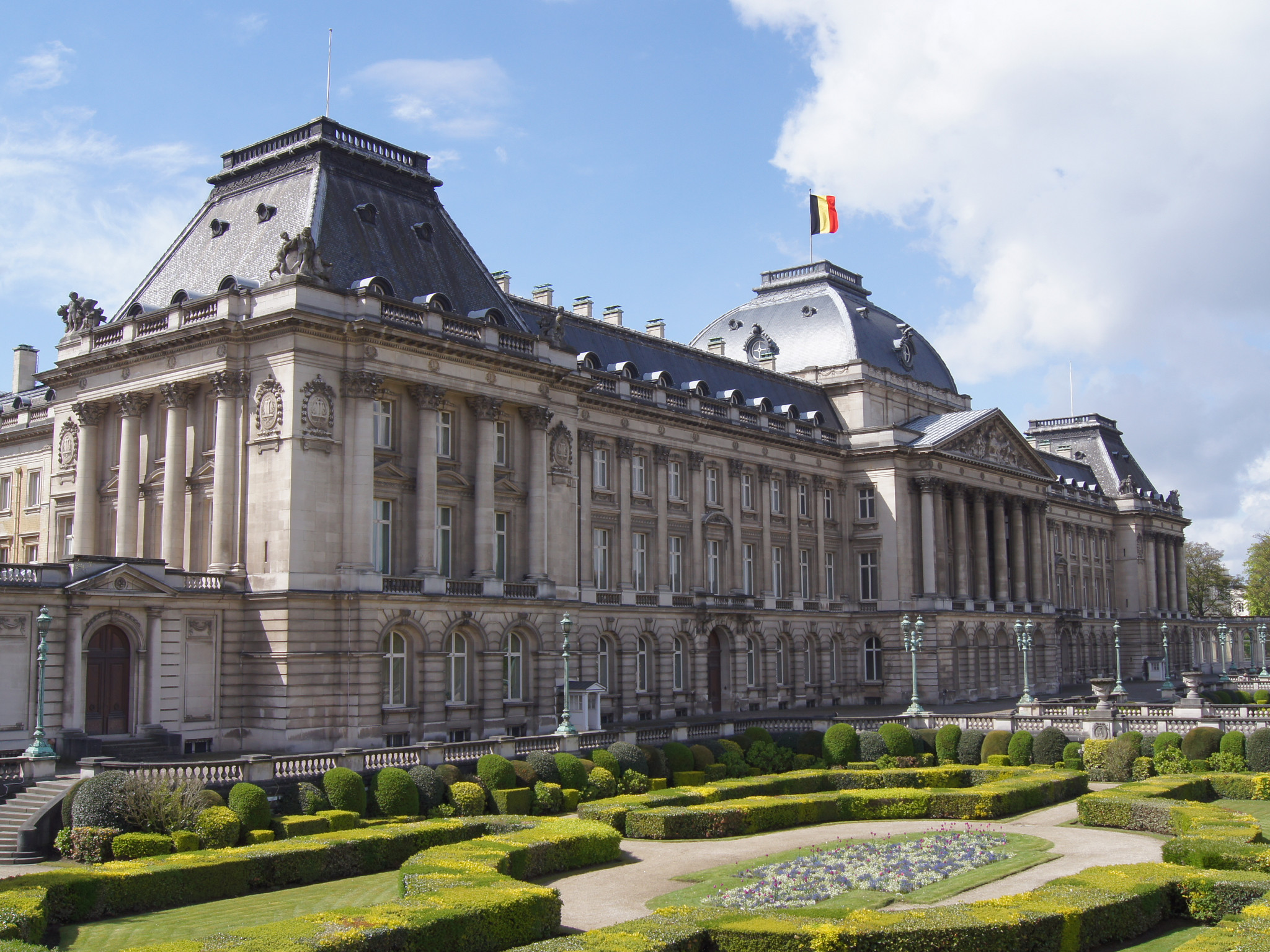
Royal Palace

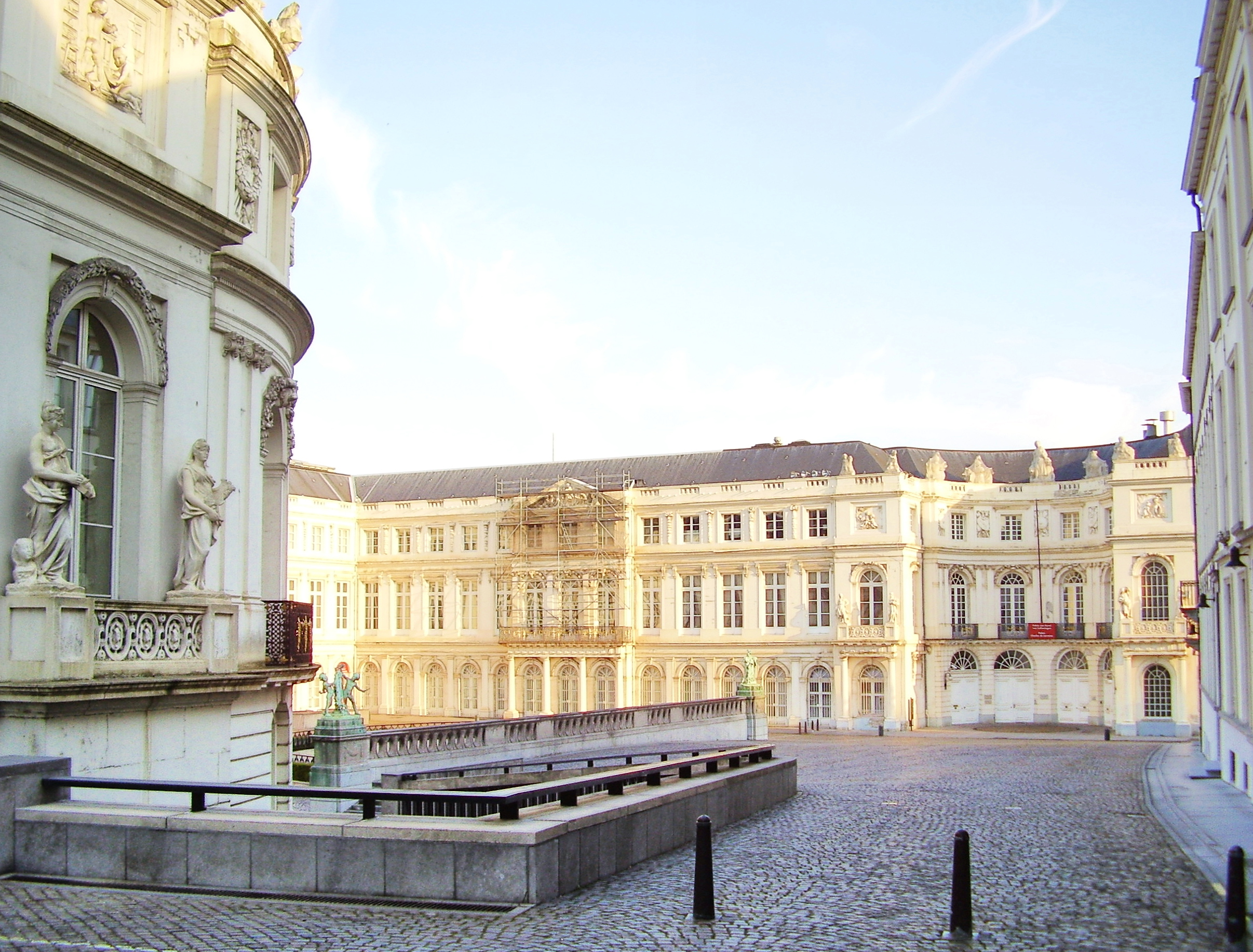
Place du Musée/Museumplein

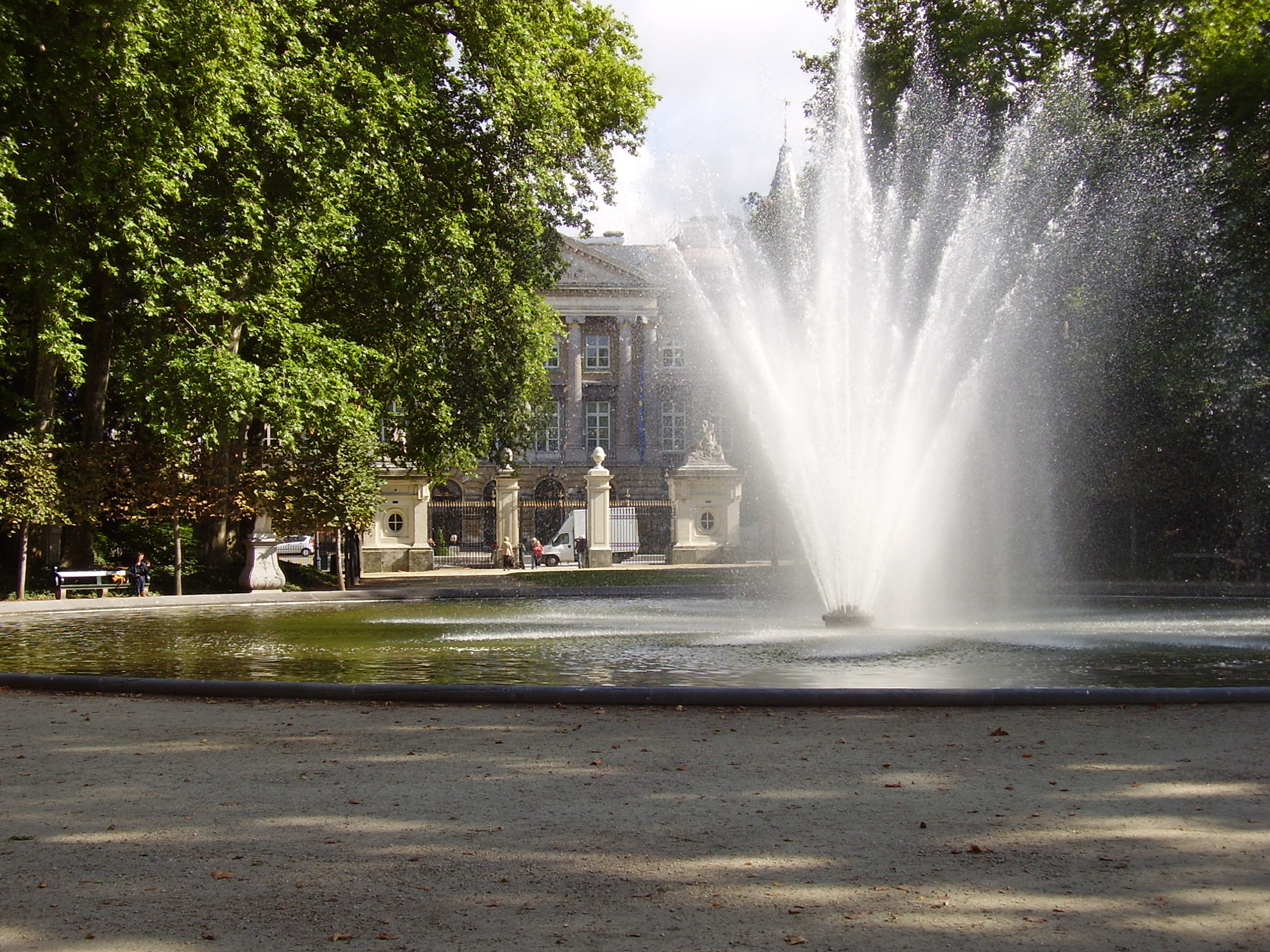
Brussels Park

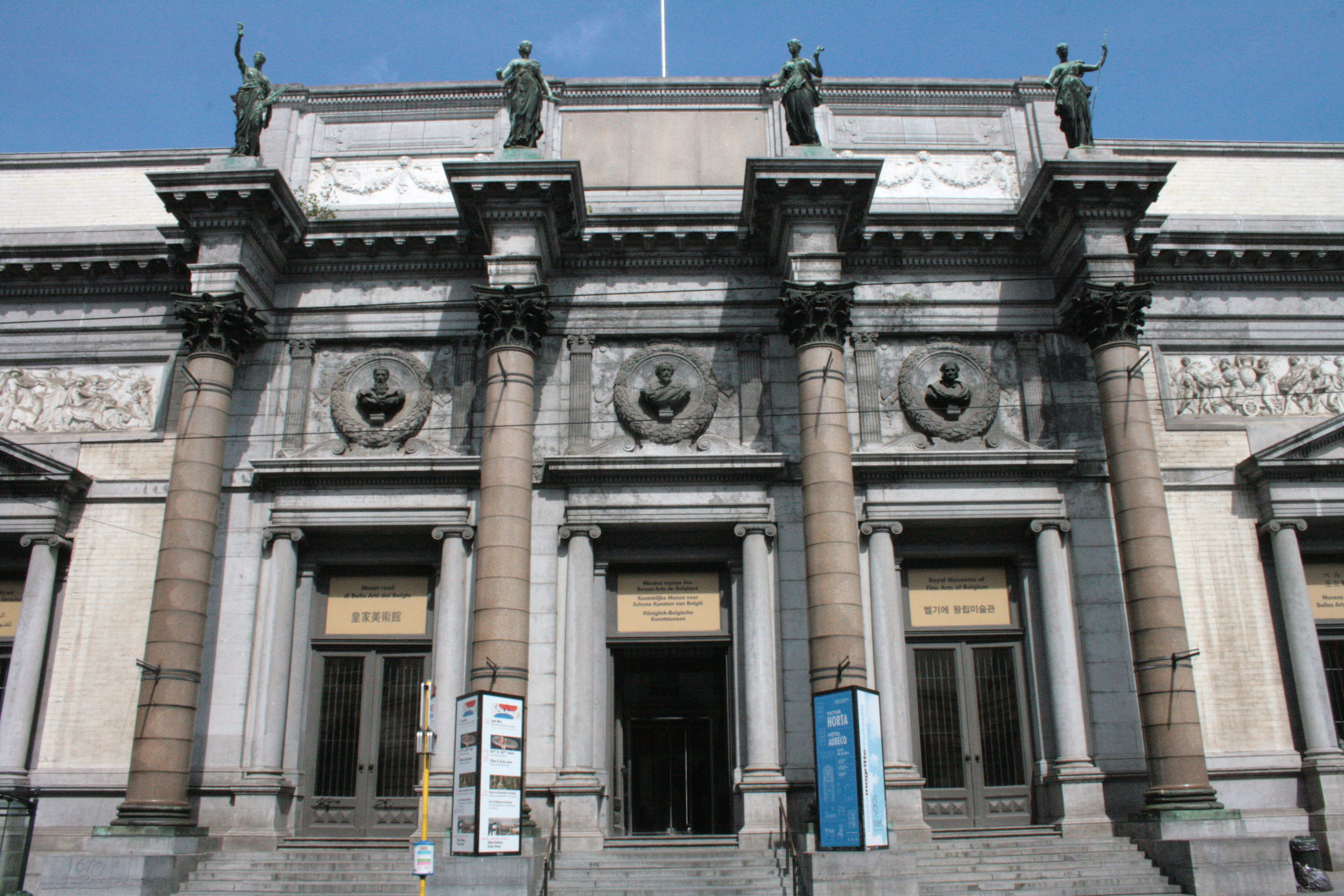
Oldmasters Museum

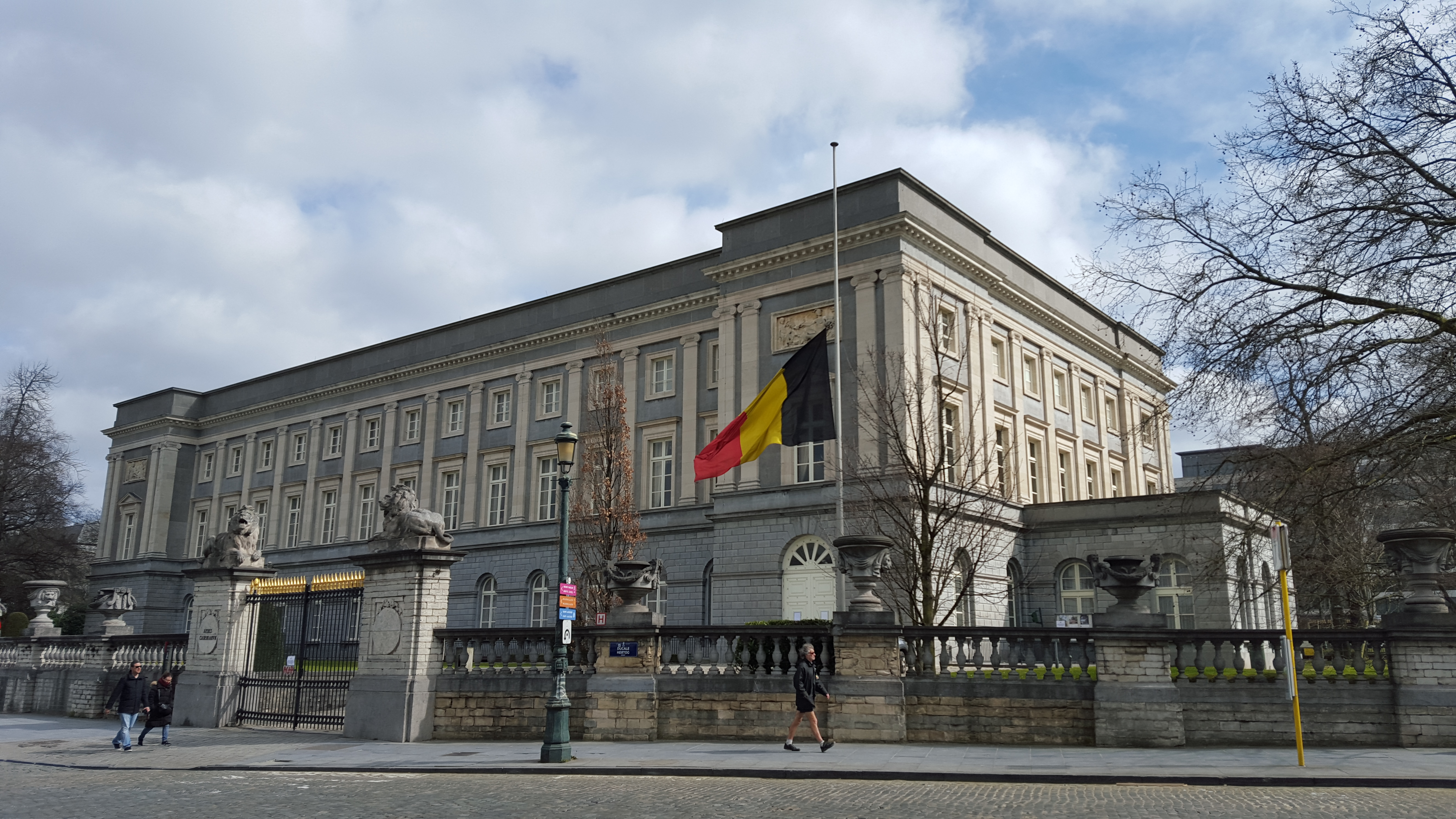
Academy Palace

==== Sablon/Zavel ====
From the Place Royale/Koningsplein, the Rue de la Régence/Regentschapsstraat crosses the Sablon/Zavel Quarter (French: Quartier du Sablon, Dutch: Zavelwijk), made of the larger Grand Sablon/Grote Zavel ("Large Sablon") square in the north-west and the smaller Petit Sablon/Kleine Zavel ("Small Sablon") square and garden in the south-east, divided by the Church of Our Lady of Victories at the Sablon. It is a swanky district, where an antiques market is held, and in which antique and art dealers, as well as other luxury shops, have their businesses. Not far from there stood the Maison du Peuple/Volkshuis in Art Nouveau style by the architect Victor Horta, until its demolition in 1965. The Sablon is also home to the Egmont Palace and the Royal Conservatory of Brussels.

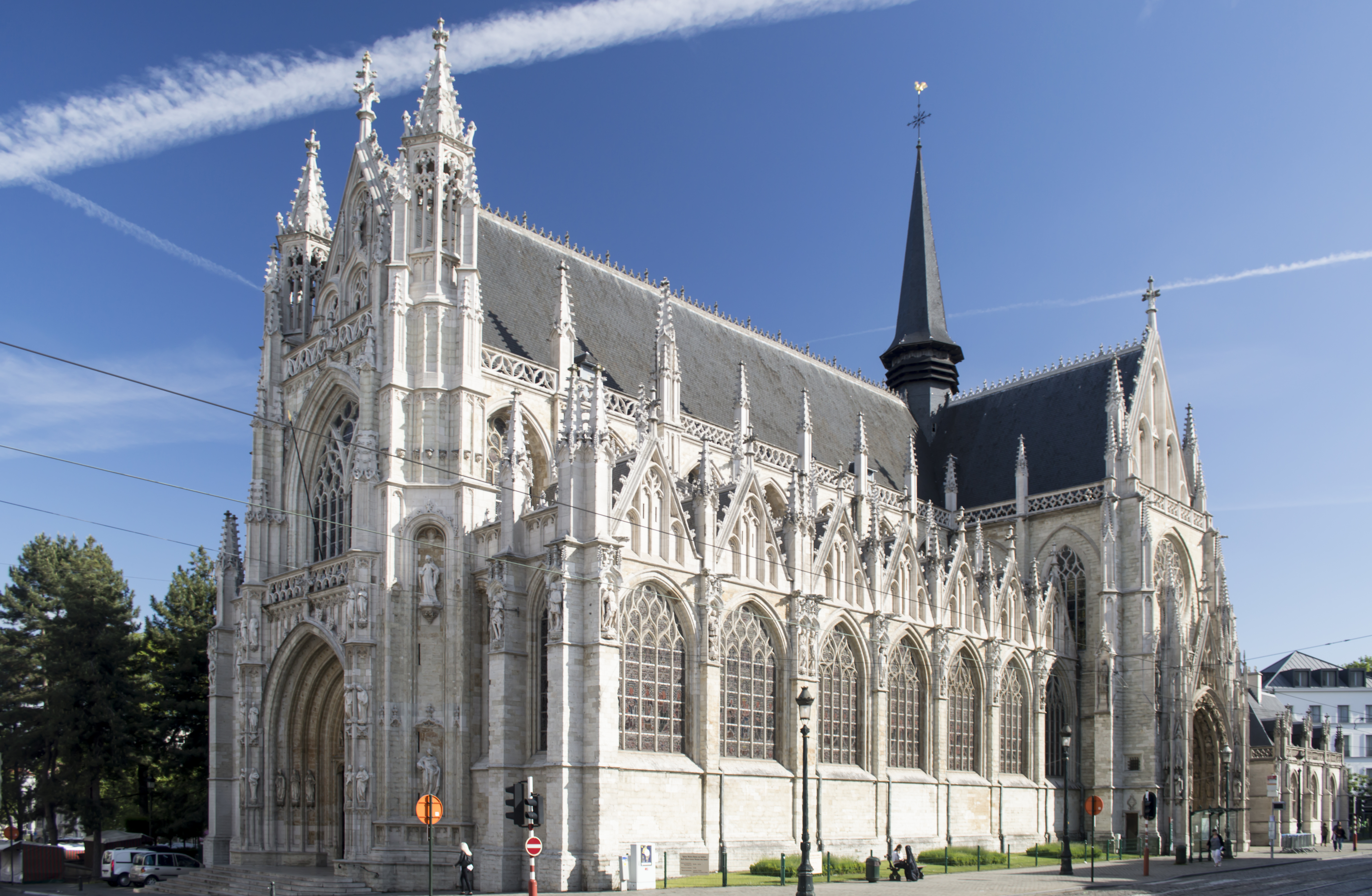
Church of Our Lady of Victories at the Sablon

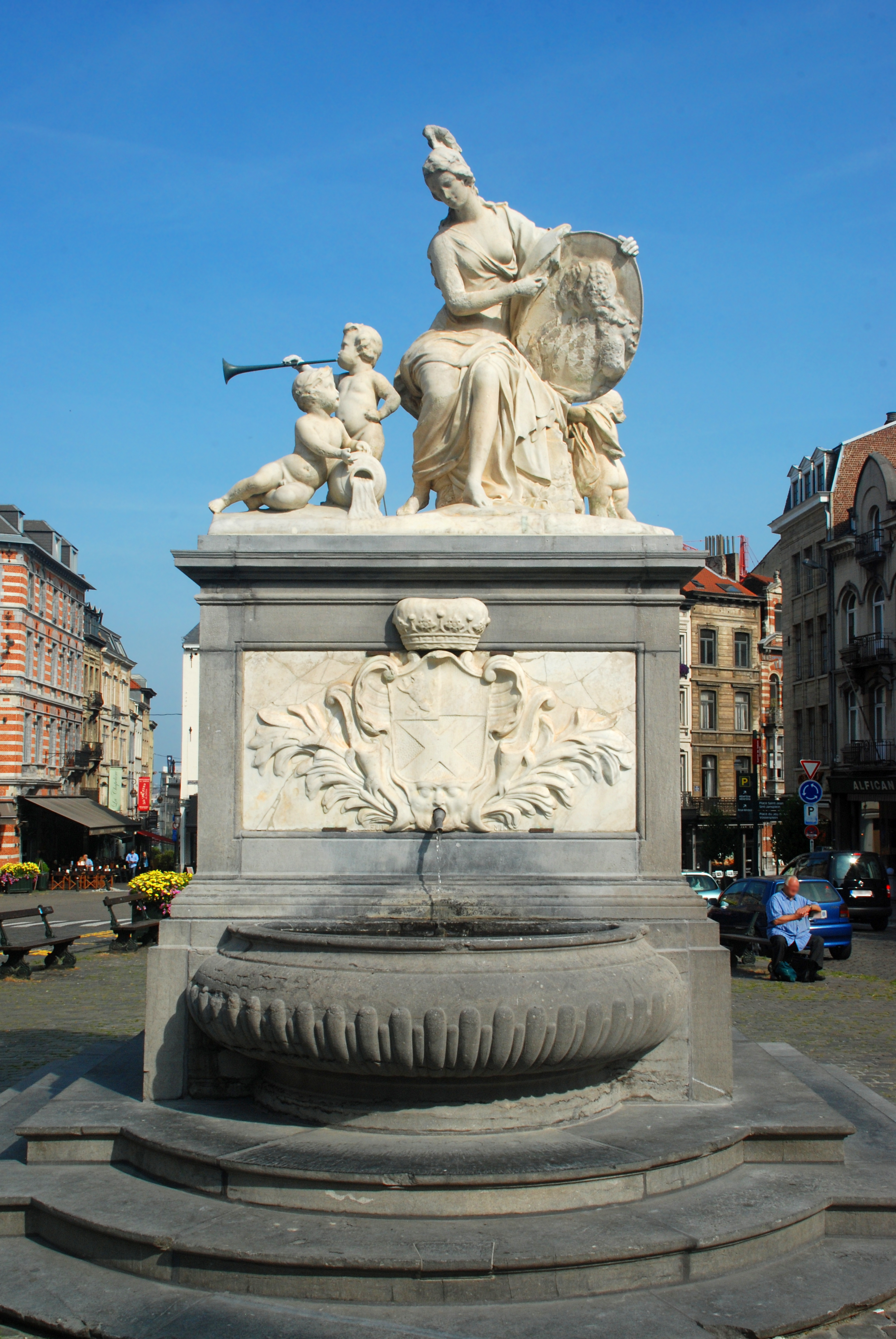
Fountain of Minerva

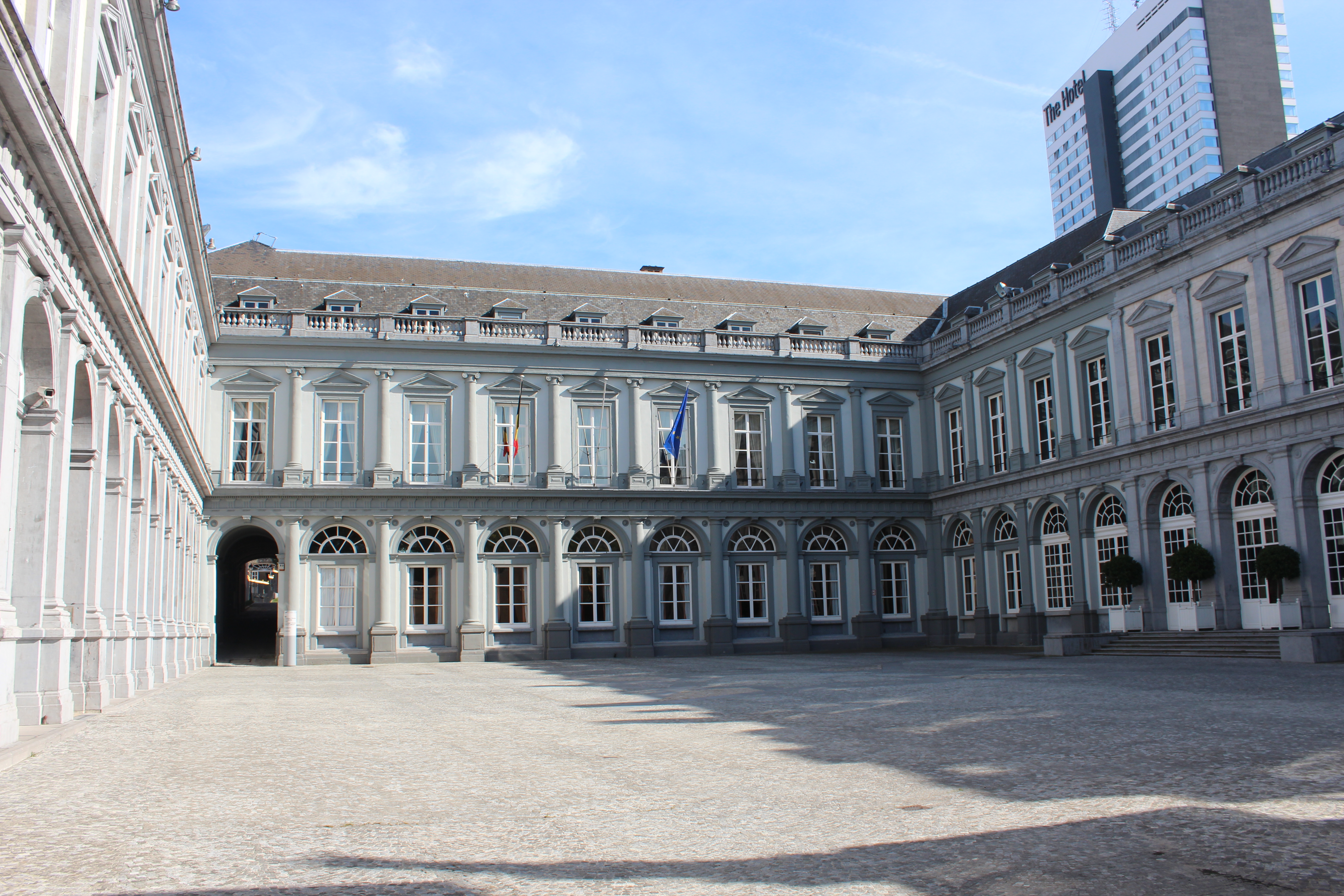
Egmont Palace

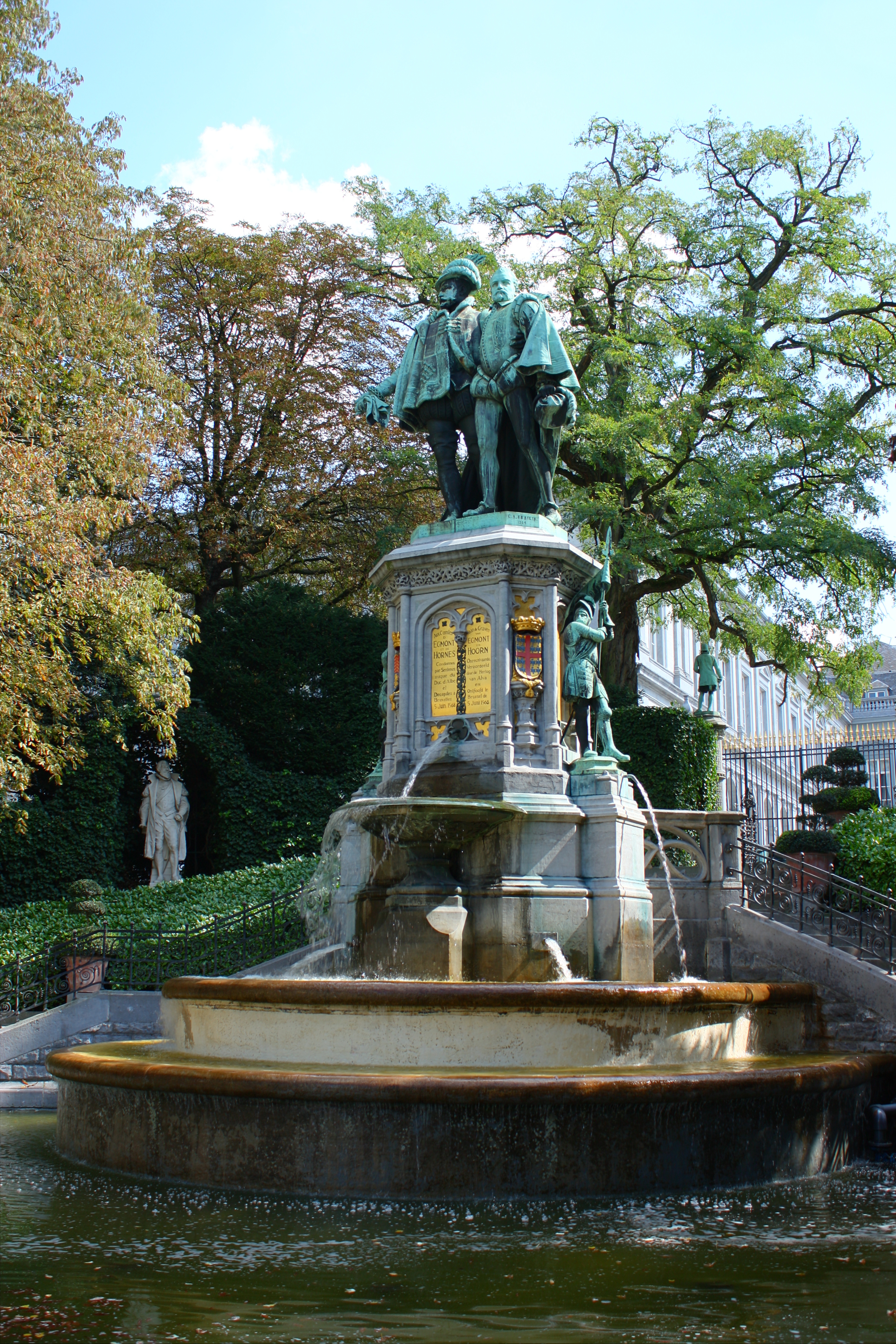
Fountain of the Counts of Egmont and Horn

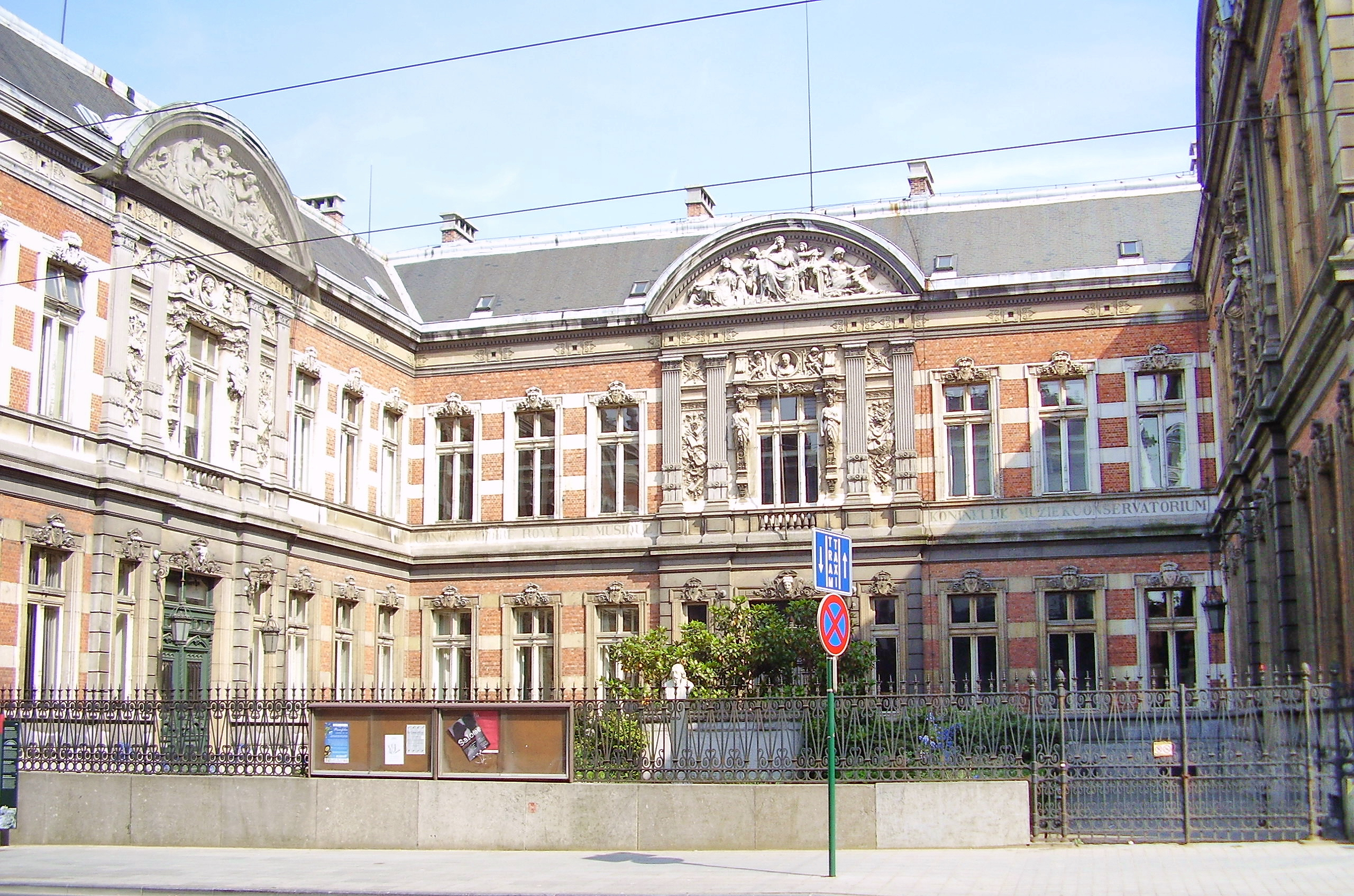
Royal Conservatory

==== Marolles/Marollen ====
In the shadow of the gigantic Palace of Justice lies the Marolles/Marollen Quarter (French: Quartier des Marolles, Dutch: Marollenwijk), not to be confused with the Marolle that purists delimit to only seven streets. From the Place de la Chapelle/Kapellemarkt to the Place du Jeu de Balle/Vossenplein, where a daily flea market known as the Old Market has been held since 1873, along the Rue Haute/Hogestraat and the Rue Blaes/Blaestraat, second-hand and popular shops have for some years given way to antique dealers, marking a profound transformation of the district. The Cité Hellemans, an example of an early 20th-century collective housing complex, was built to replace the neighbourhood's many squalid cul-de-sacs. The Rue Haute, one of the city's longest and oldest streets, follows the course of an old Gallo-Roman road, and runs along St. Peter's Hospital, which was itself built in 1935 on the site of a leprosarium, to end at the Halle Gate, the only remaining gate in a series that allowed passage inside the second walls of Brussels.

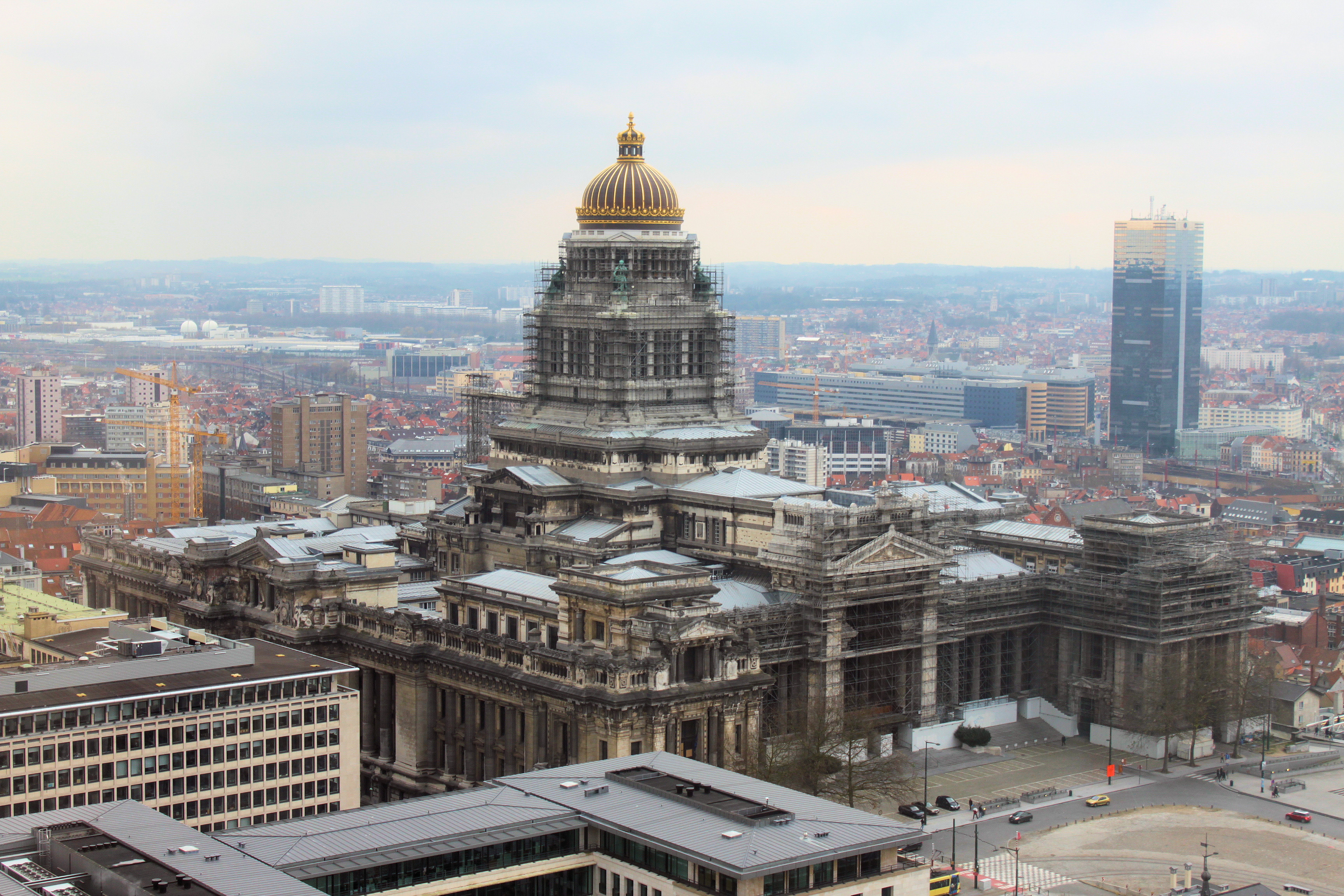
Palace of Justice

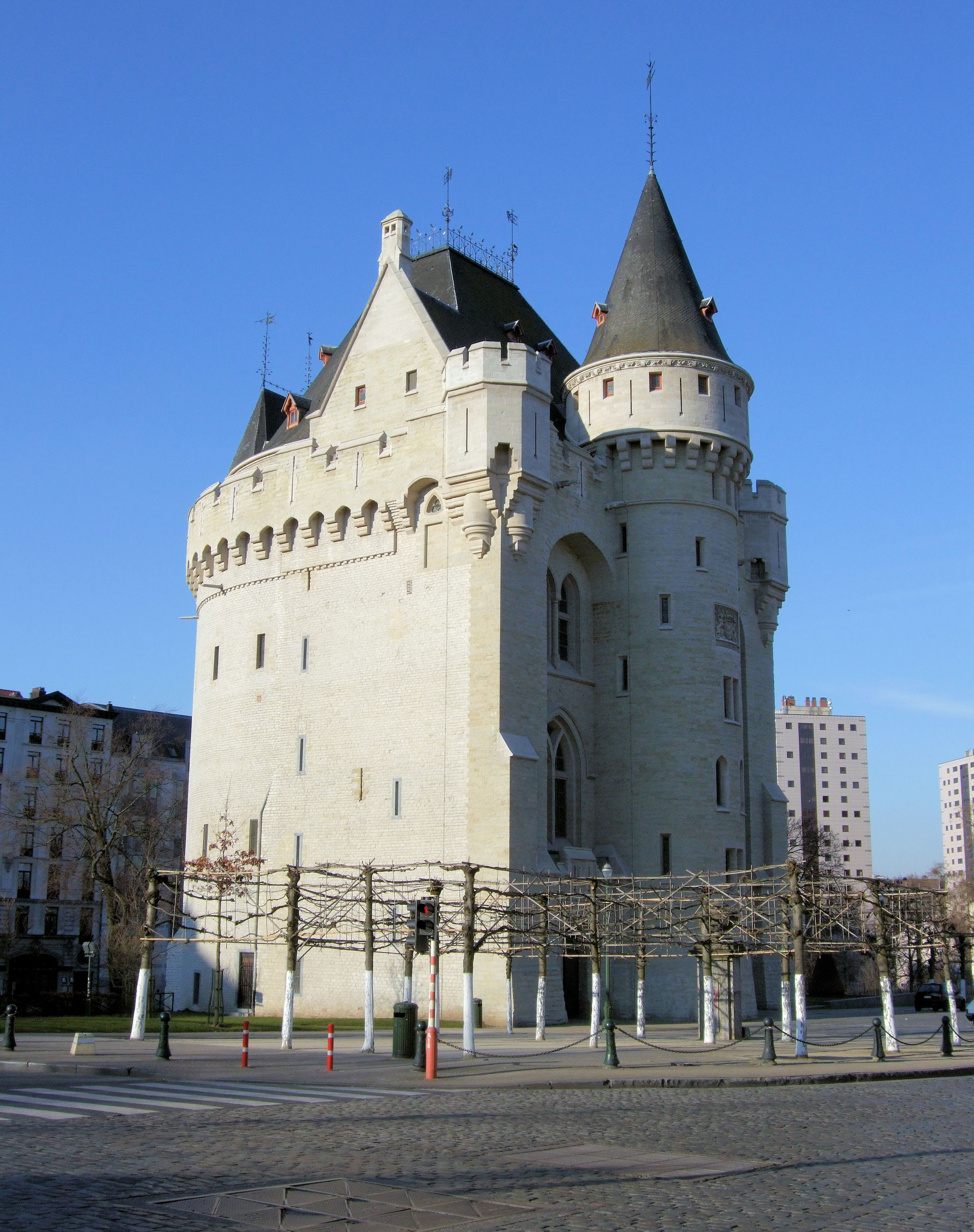
Halle Gate

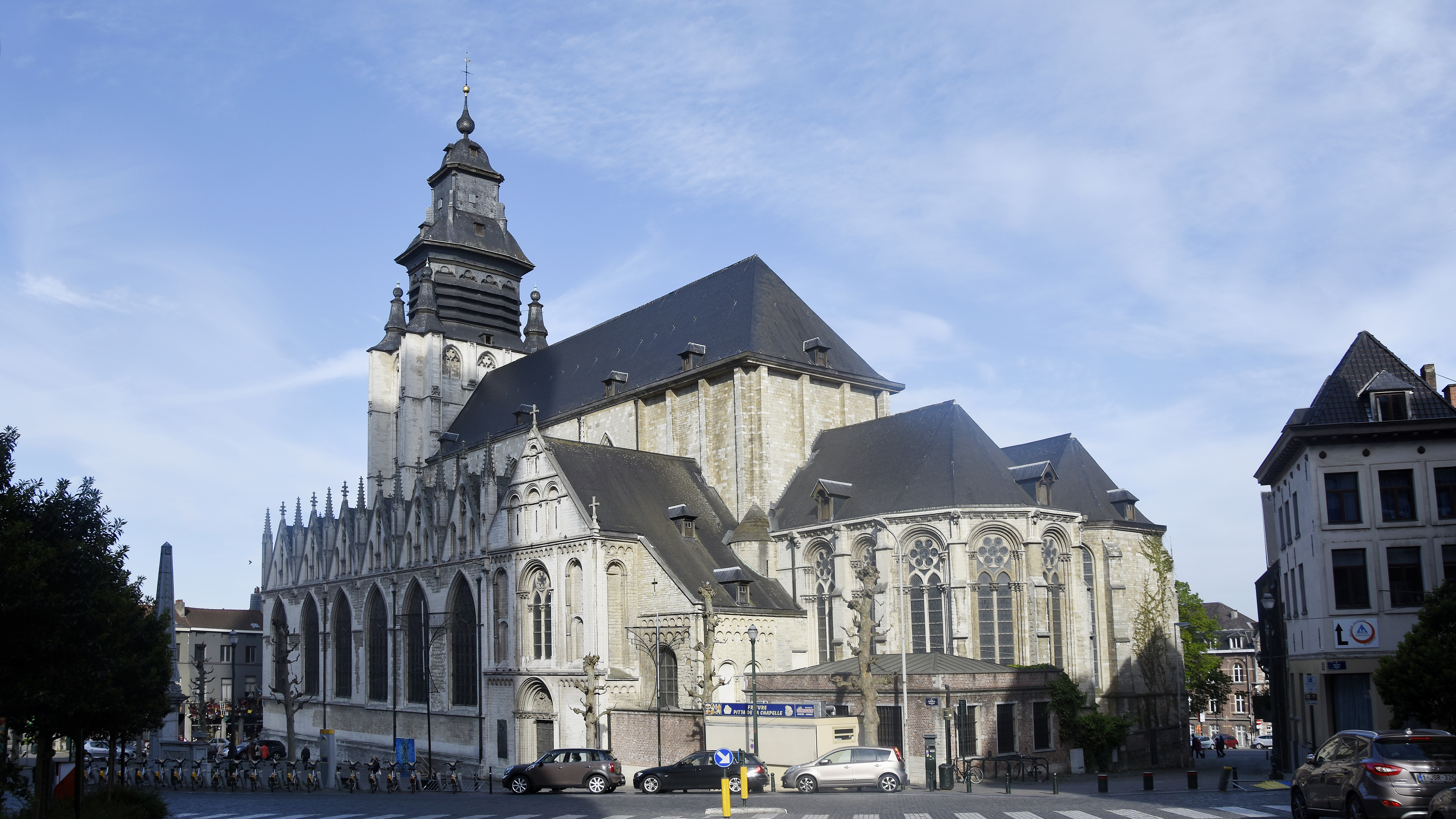
Church of Our Lady of the Chapel

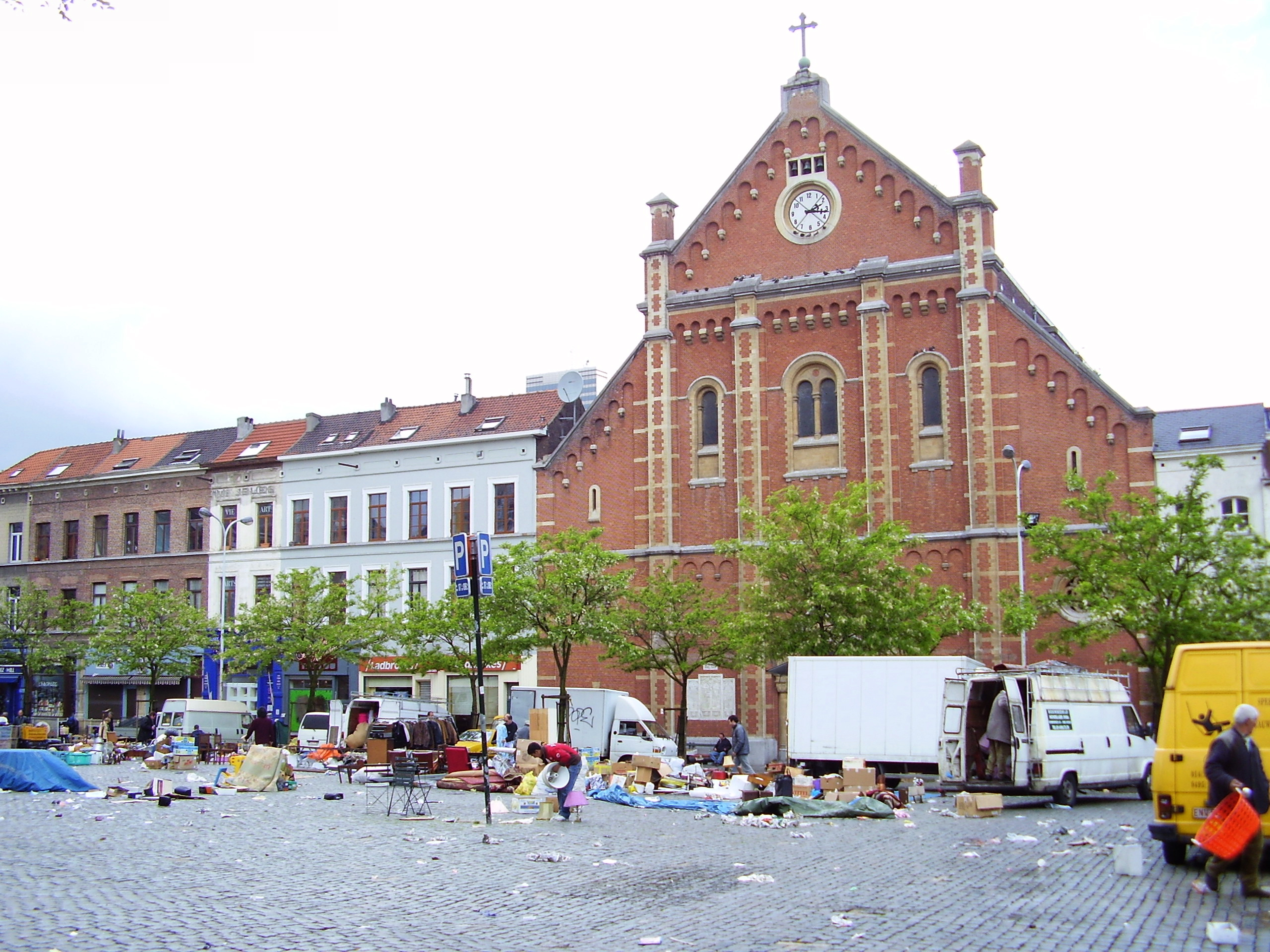
Place du Jeu de Balle/Vossenplein, end of a market

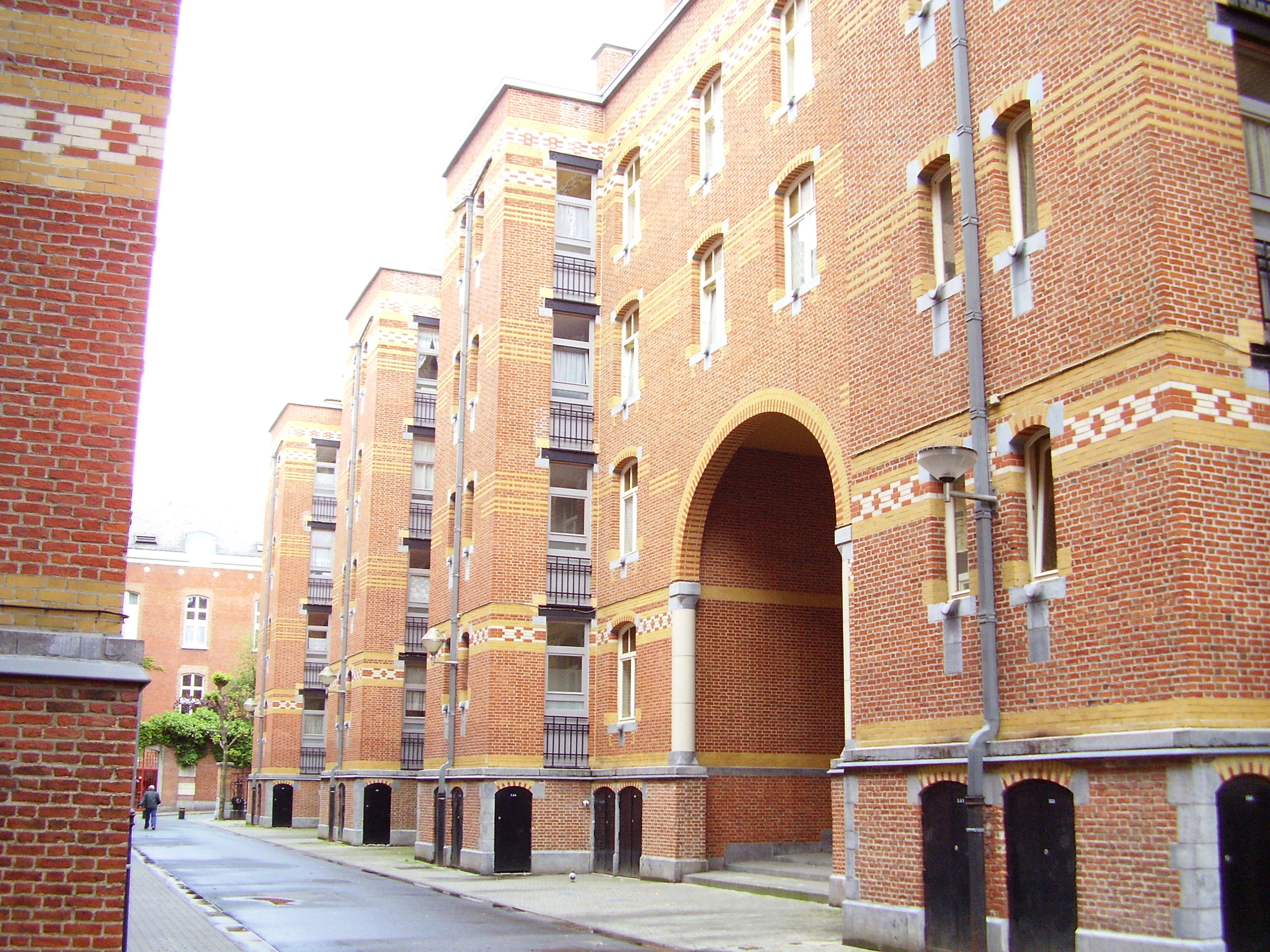
Cité Hellemans on the Rue Blaes/Blaesstraat

==== Midi–Lemonnier Quarter (Stalingrad) ====
It was in the heart of the Midi–Lemonnier Quarter (French: Quartier Midi–Lemonnier, Dutch: Lemmonier–Zuidwijk), where the Place Rouppe/Rouppeplein is today, that Brussels' first South Station, the terminus of the South Line, was built in 1839. It was known as Bogards' railway station for the eponymous convent whose site it was built on, and to which the Rue des Bogards/Bogaardenstraat is now the only reference. The former presence of a station at this location also explains the unusual width of the current Avenue de Stalingrad/Stalingradlaan, which goes from the square to the Small Ring, cleared of its train tracks since the inauguration of Brussels-South railway station, built outside the Pentagon in 1869. Because of this, the neighbourhood is sometimes called the Stalingrad Quarter (French: Quartier Stalingrad, Dutch: Stalingradwijk). At the same time, following the covering of the Senne, the district saw the construction of Haussmann-esque grand central boulevards, including the Boulevard Maurice Lemonnier/Maurice Lemonnierlaan, bordered by the Place Fontainas/Fontainasplein and the Place Anneessens/Anneessensplein (former location of the Old Market), as well as by the South Palace. Each Sunday morning, the Midi district hosts the second largest market in Europe.

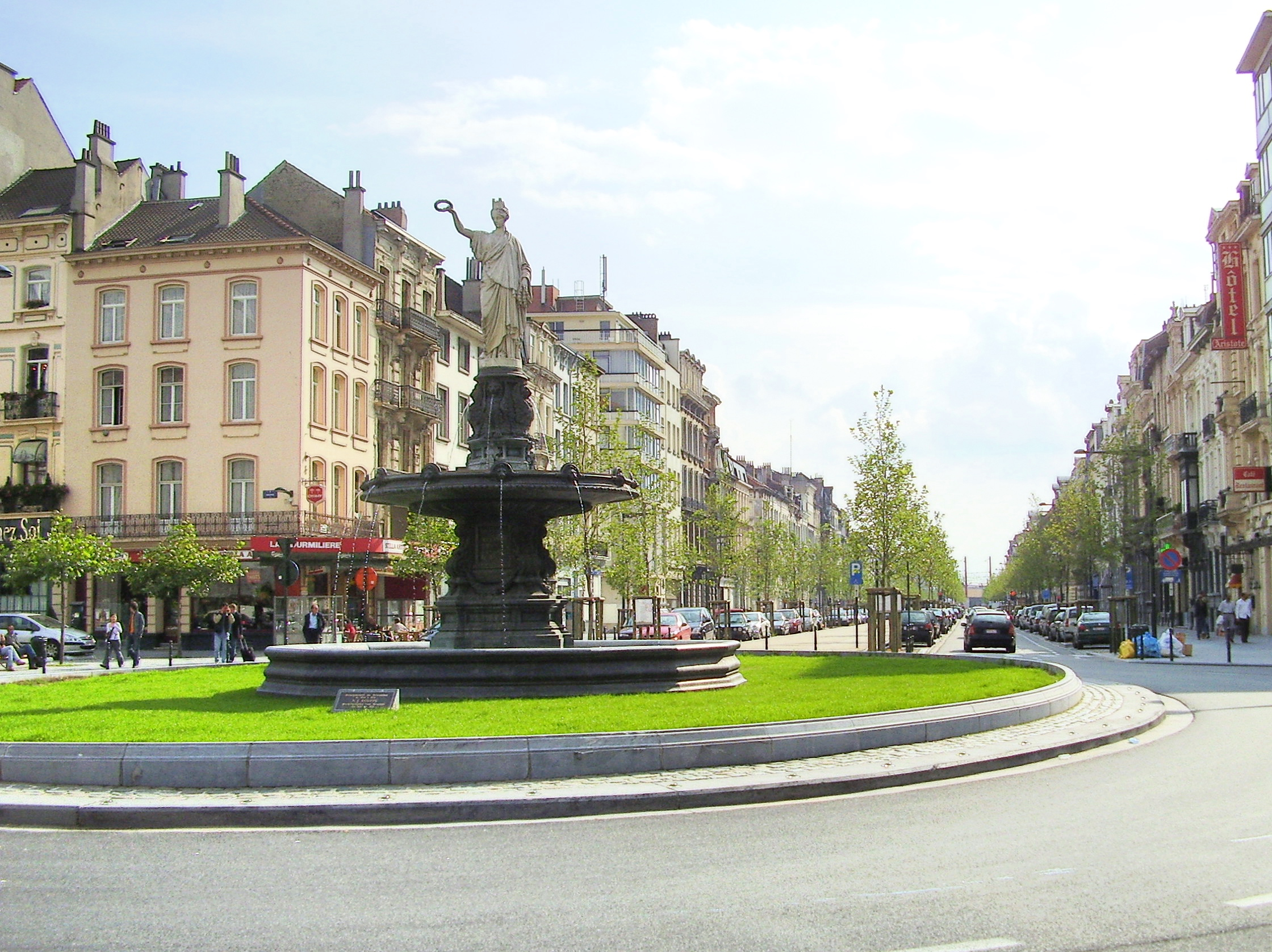
Place Rouppe/Rouppeplein and Avenue de Stalingrad/Stalingradlaan

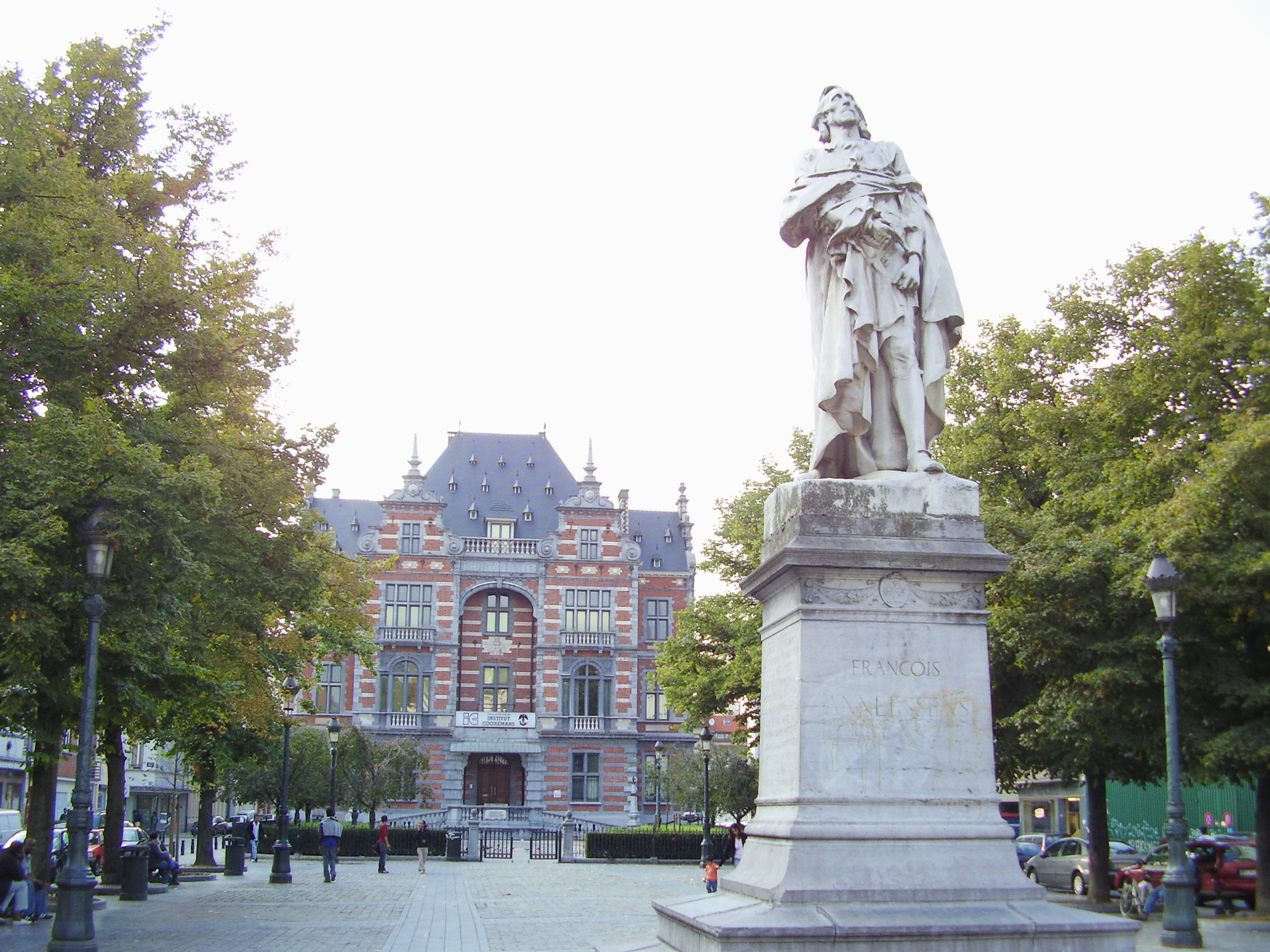
Place Anneessens/Anneessensplein (François Anneessens) and Haute École Francisco Ferrer

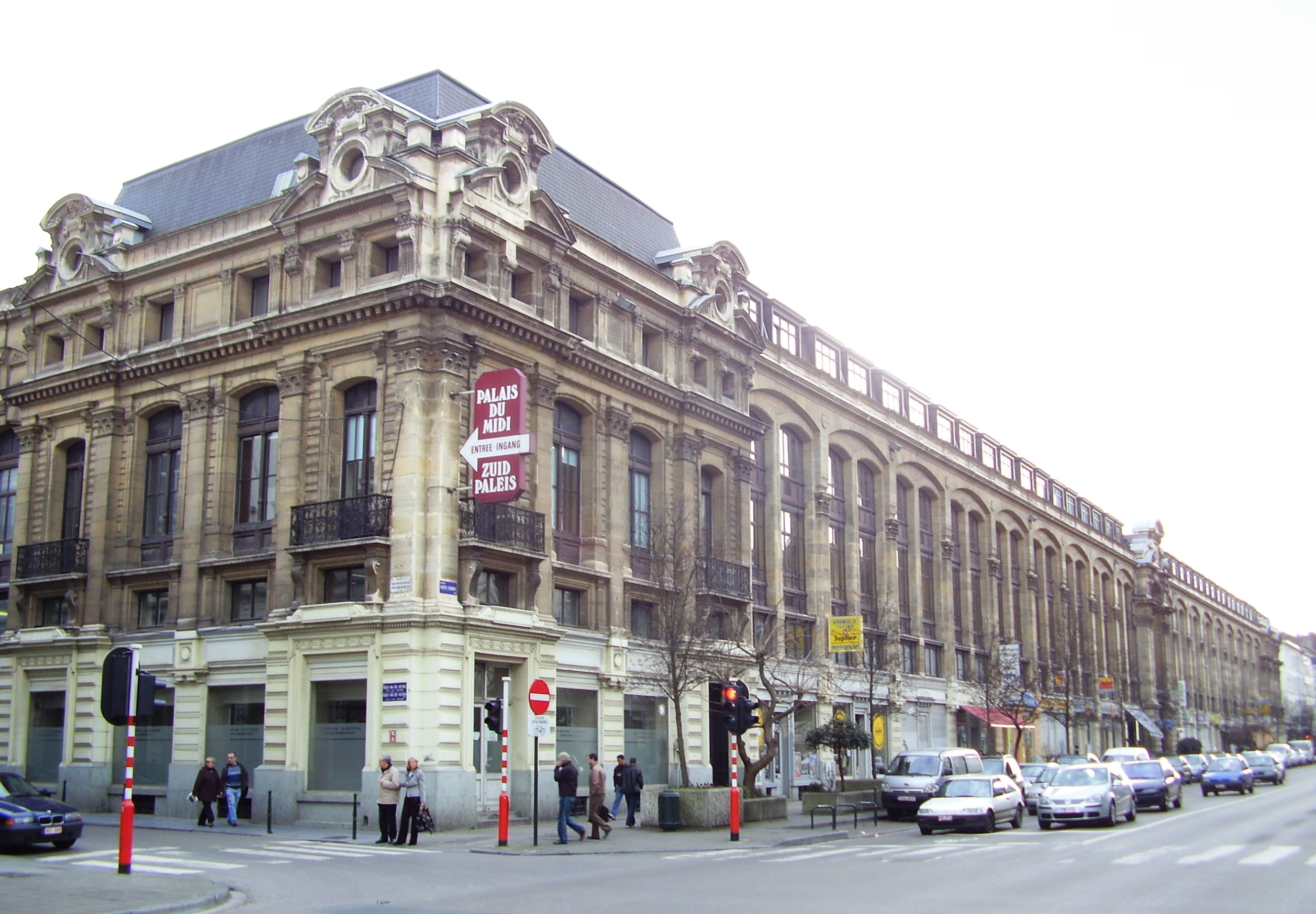
South Palace on the Boulevard Maurice Lemonnier/Maurice Lemonnierlaan

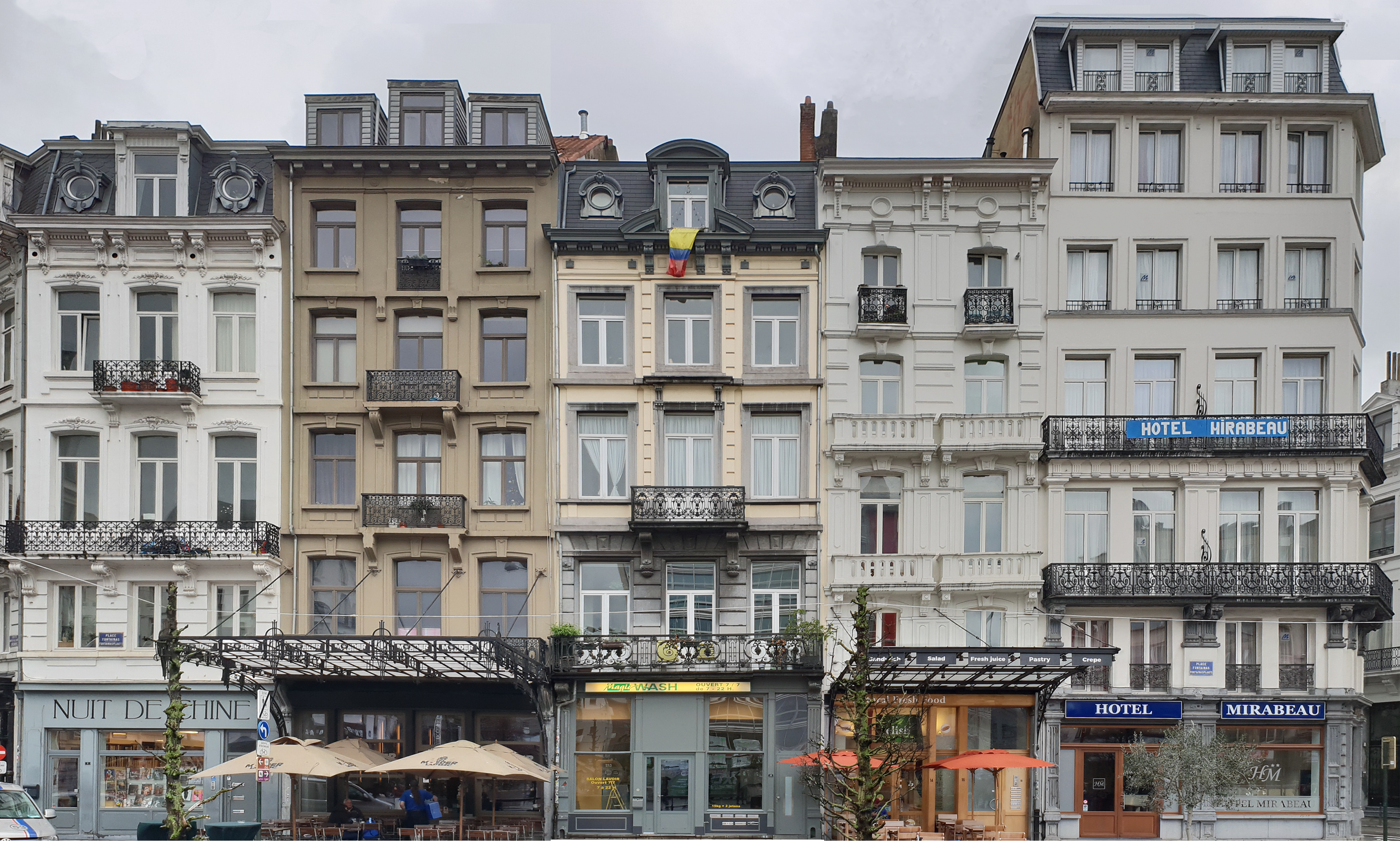
Place Fontainas/Fontainasplein

==== Senne/Zenne Quarter (Dansaert) ====
The damp and marshy land around the present-day Rue de la Senne/Zennestraat and Rue des Fabriques/Fabriekstraat was occupied by craftsmen since the Middle Ages. An arm of the river crossed the defences of the second walls at the level of the Ninove Gate via the Petite Écluse/Kleine Sluis ("Small Lock"), which served as a maritime gate, an end of which remaining there until the 1960s. Later, small industries and many artisan breweries (now disappeared) established themselves in the area, as evidenced by the names of the Rue du Houblon/Hopstraat ("Hops Street") and the Rue du Vieux Marché aux Grains/Oude Graanmarktstraat ("Old Grain Market Street"). The Shot Tower (French: Tour à Plomb, Dutch: Loodtoren), which was used to manufacture lead shot for hunting, and the Rue de la Poudrière/Kruitmolenstraat ("Gunpowder Street"), also testify to the neighbourhood's former activities. Long neglected following the relocation of businesses outside the city centre, the Senne/Zenne Quarter (French: Quartier de la Senne, Dutch: Zennewijk) has in recent years been the object of renewed interest and is undergoing gentrification due to the many disused industrial premises being converted into lofts. The area around the Rue Antoine Dansaert/Antoine Dansaertstraat has become a trendy district and is attracting a younger, more well-off, and mostly Dutch-speaking population. This new situation, which has resulted in rising rents, is not without problems for the neighbourhood's less fortunate inhabitants.

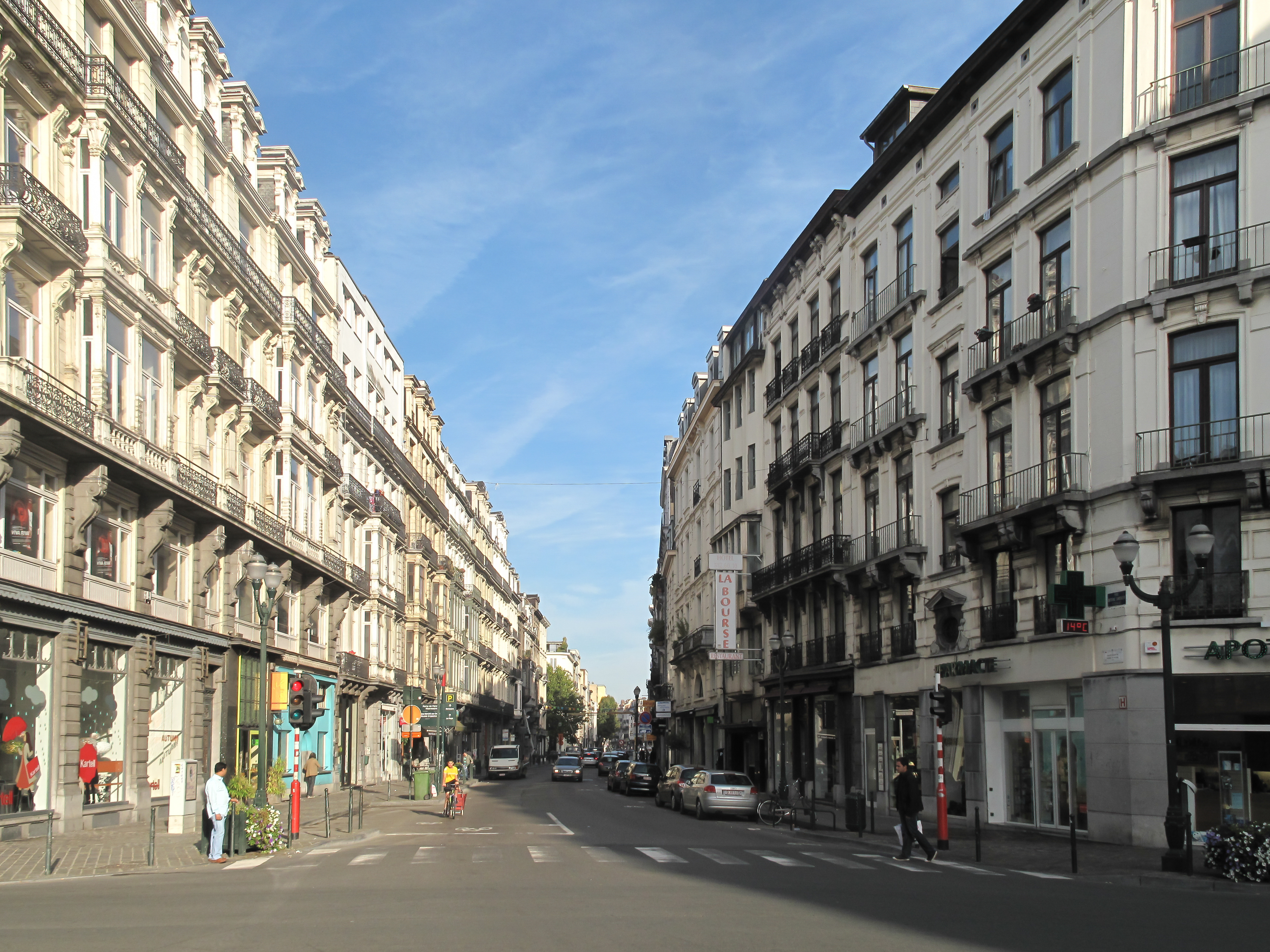
Rue Antoine Dansaert/Antoine Dansaertstraat

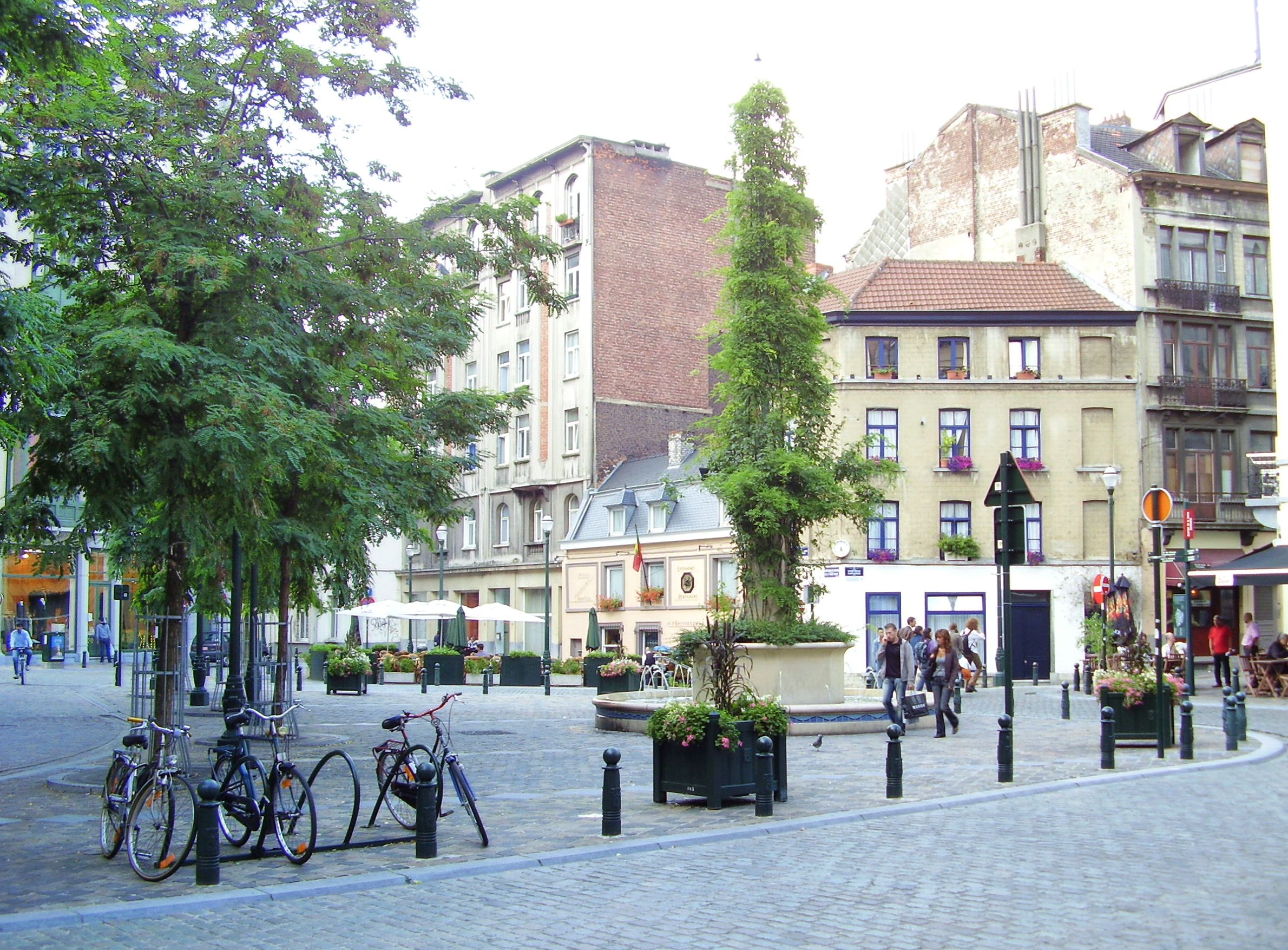
Place du Jardin aux Fleurs/Bloemenhofplein

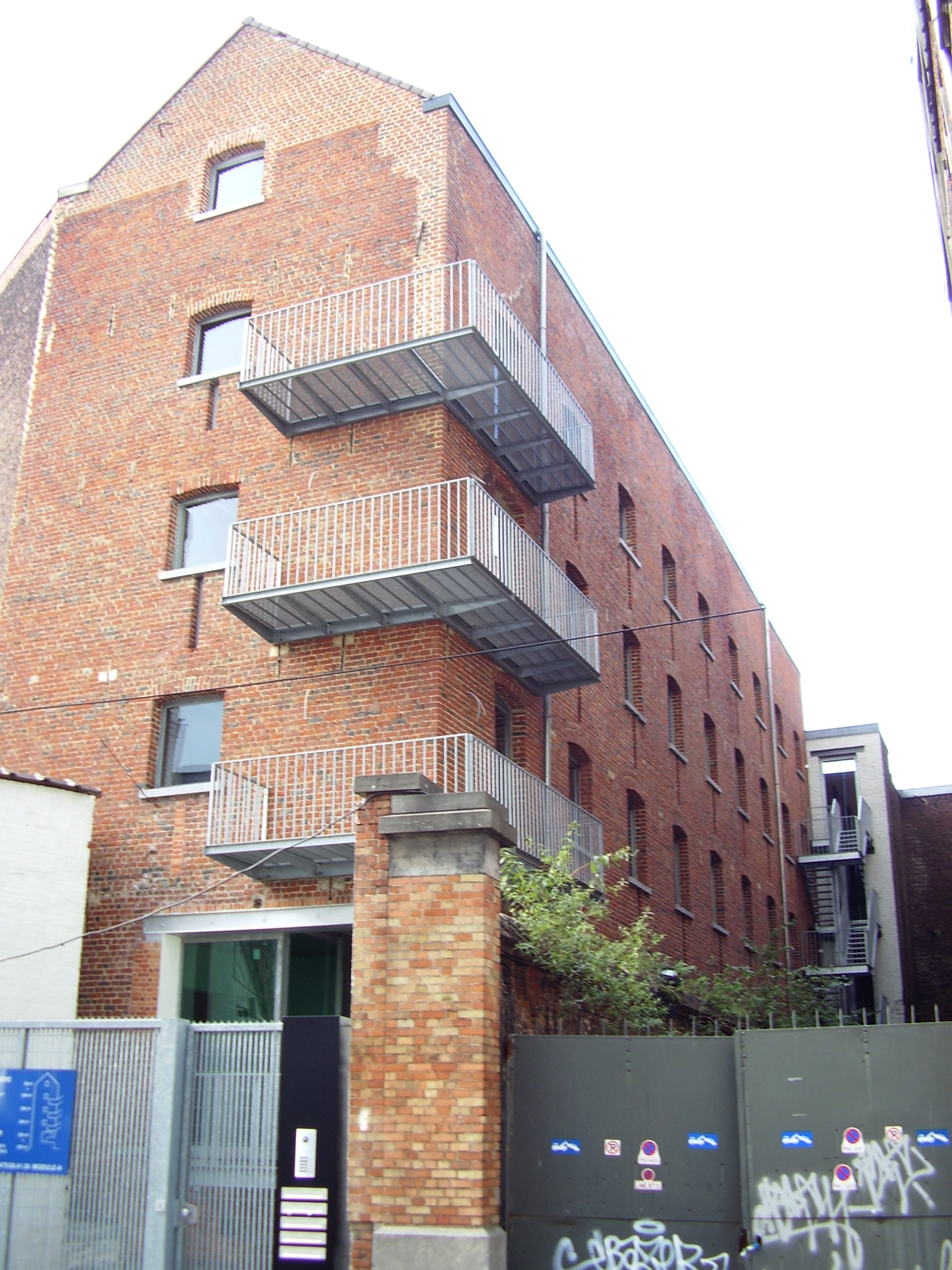
Industrial building transformed into housing (loft)

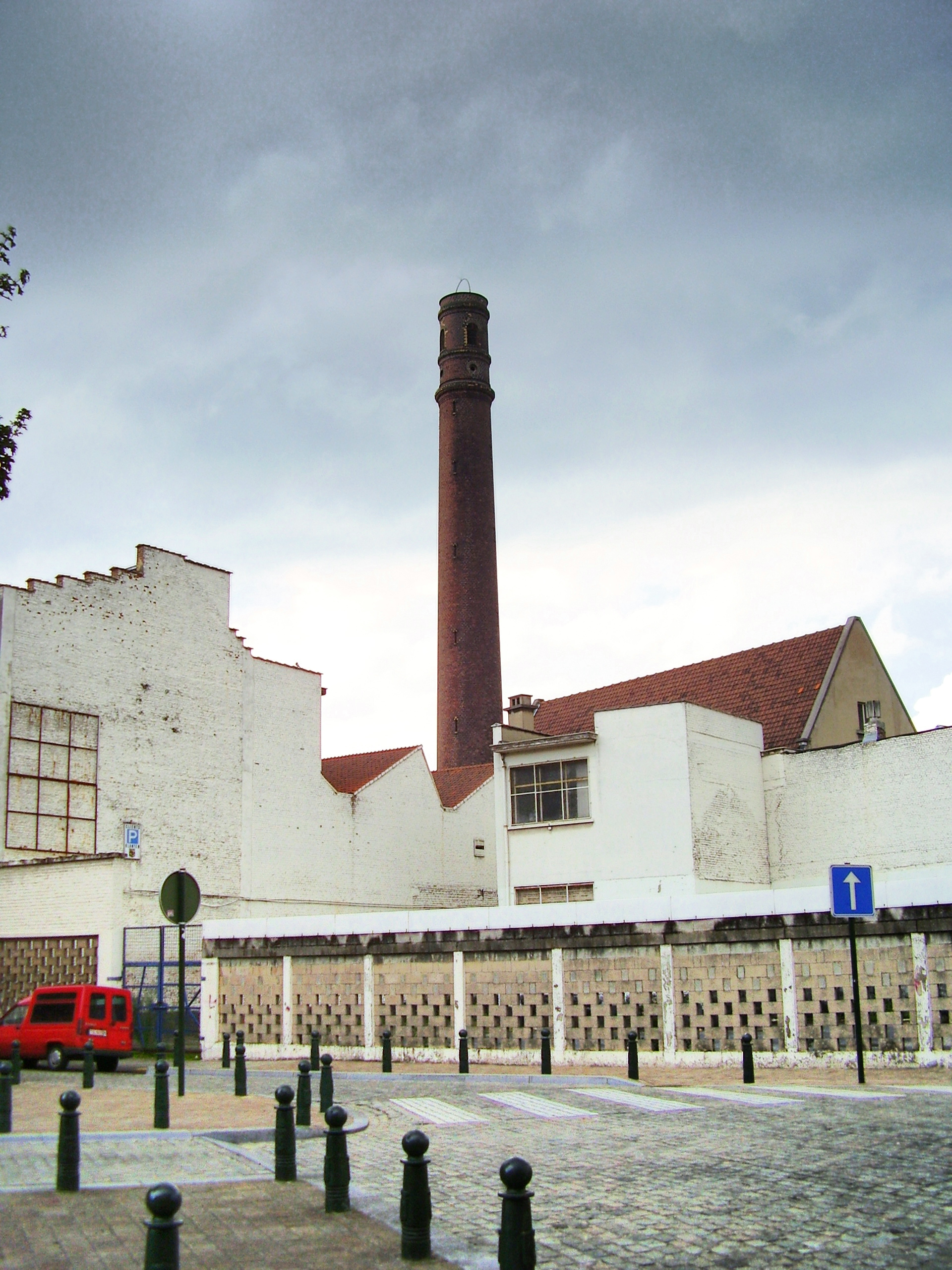
Shot Tower

==== Quays Quarter (Sainte-Catherine/Sint-Katelijne) ====
The Quays Quarter (French: Quartier des Quais, Dutch: Kaaienwijk) is that of the old Port of Brussels, which for a long time played the role of "belly" of the city. Boats coming from the river Scheldt entered through the former Shore Gate (French: Porte du Rivage, Dutch: Oeverpoort), on the site of the present-day Place de l'Yser/Ijzerplein, to join one of the canals, whose docks were each reserved for one type of goods. Filled in the late 19th century with the opening of Brussels' new port, these basins were replaced by wide boulevards, whose names on both sides still recall their former function: the Quai aux Briques/Baksteenkaai ("Brick Wharf"), the Quai au Bois à Brûler/Brandhoutkaai ("Firewood Wharf"), the Quai aux Pierres de Taille/Arduinkaai ("Quarry Stone Wharf"), the Quai au Foin/Hooikaai ("Hay Wharf"), etc., or references to the neighbourhood's commercial activities: the Rue du Magasin/Pakhuisstraat ("Warehouse Street"), the Rue des Commerçants/Koopliedenstraat ("Traders Street"), the Rue du Marché aux Porcs/Varkensmarktstraat ("Pig Market Street") and the Quai du Commerce/Handelskaai ("Trade Wharf"). Along the quaysides, numerous bourgeois houses, once belonging to wealthy merchants, have preserved the entrances to the warehouses. On the Boulevard d'Ypres/Ieperlaan, one can still cross food wholesalers, now supplied by trucks that have replaced the boats. The district also includes the Great Beguinage of Brussels, with the Church of St. John the Baptist and the Grand Hospice Pachéco.

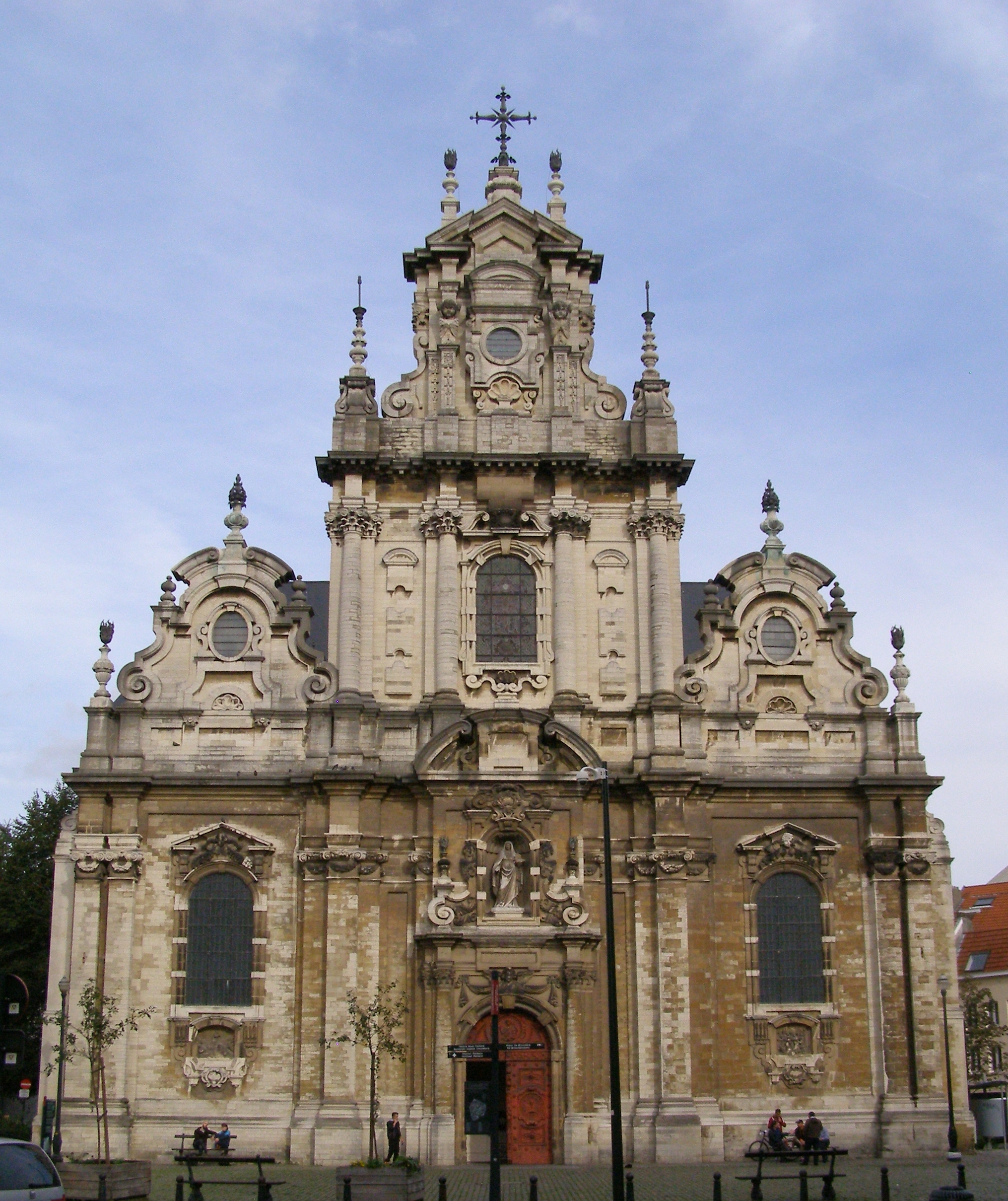
Church of St. John the Baptist

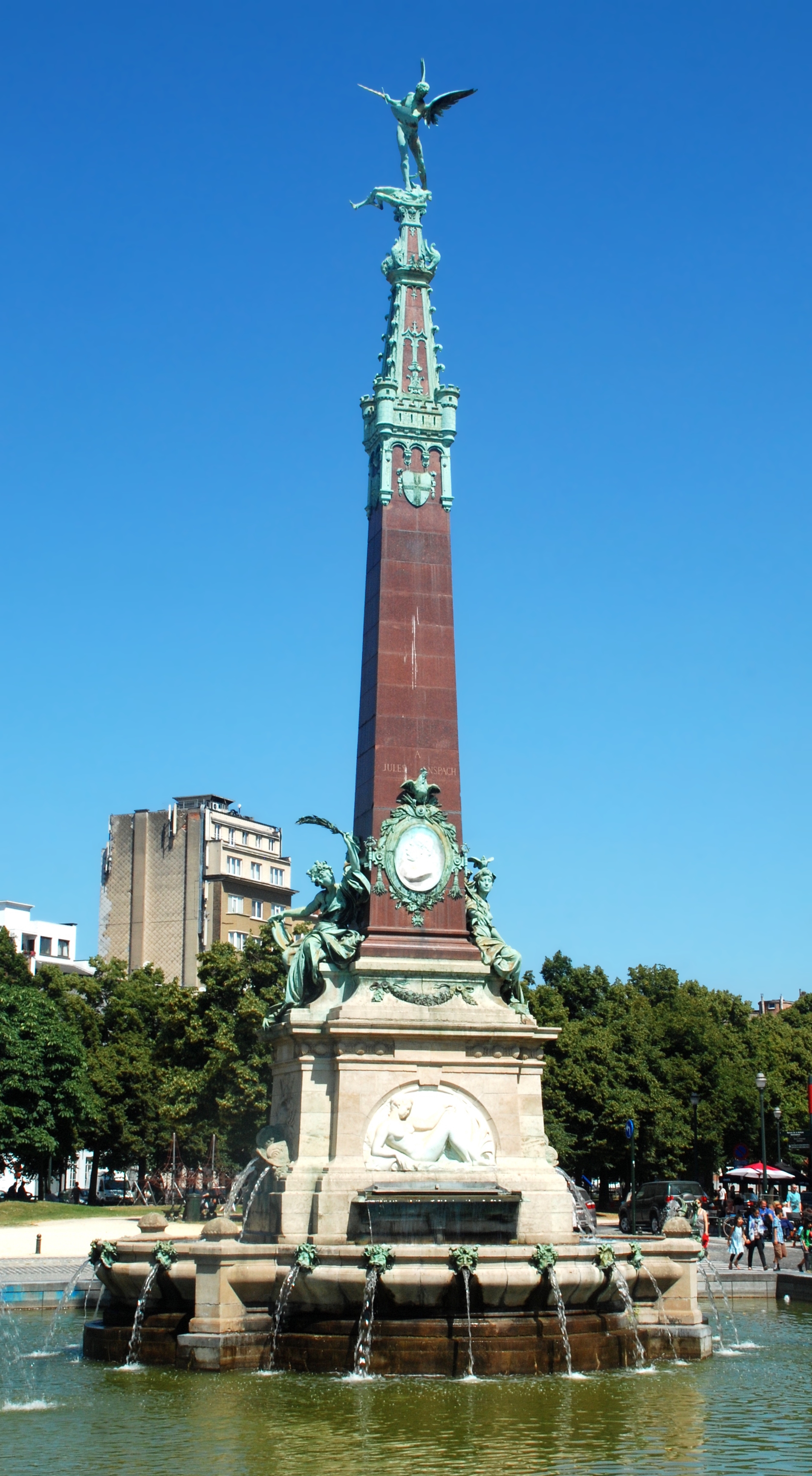
Anspach Fountain

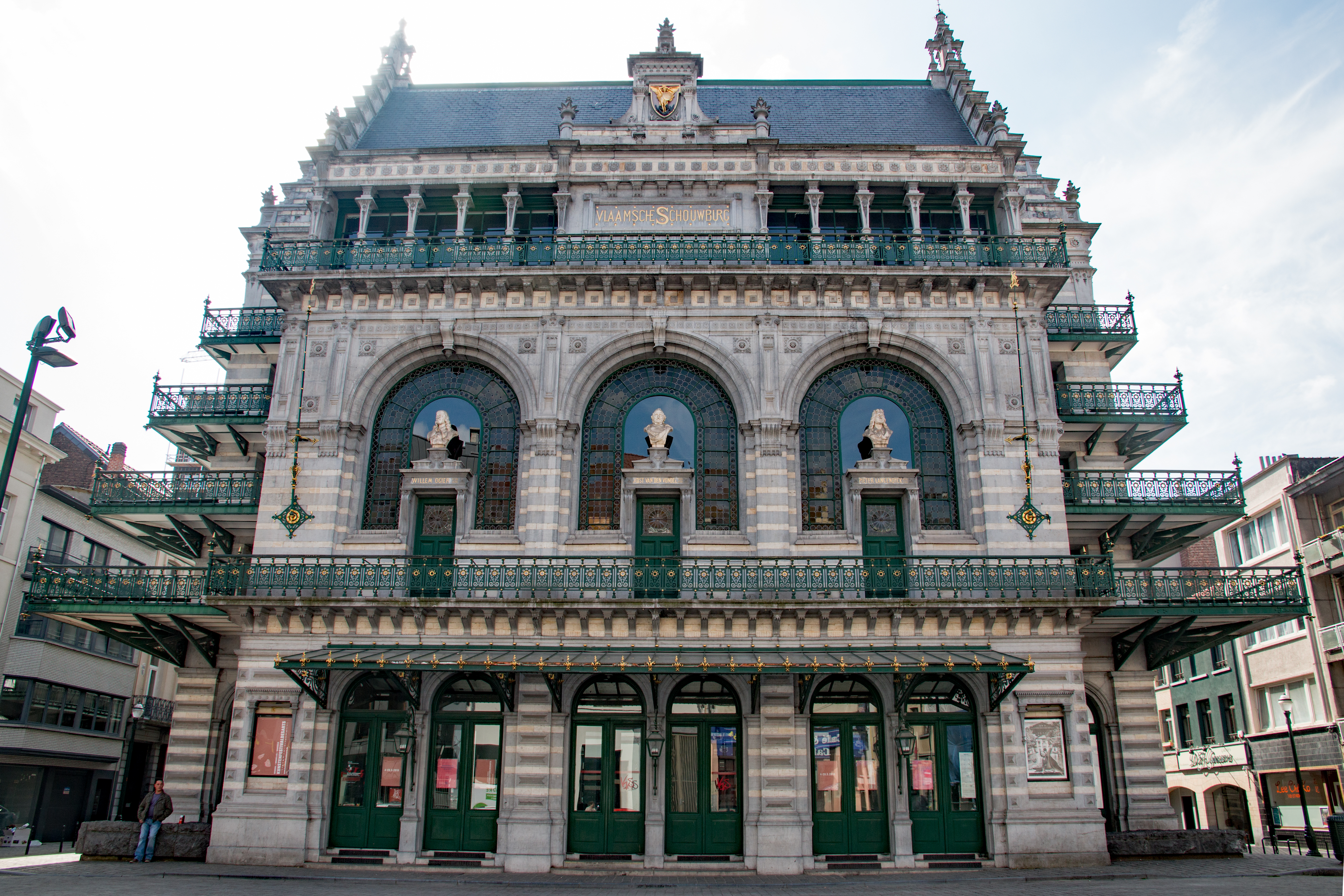
Royal Flemish Theatre

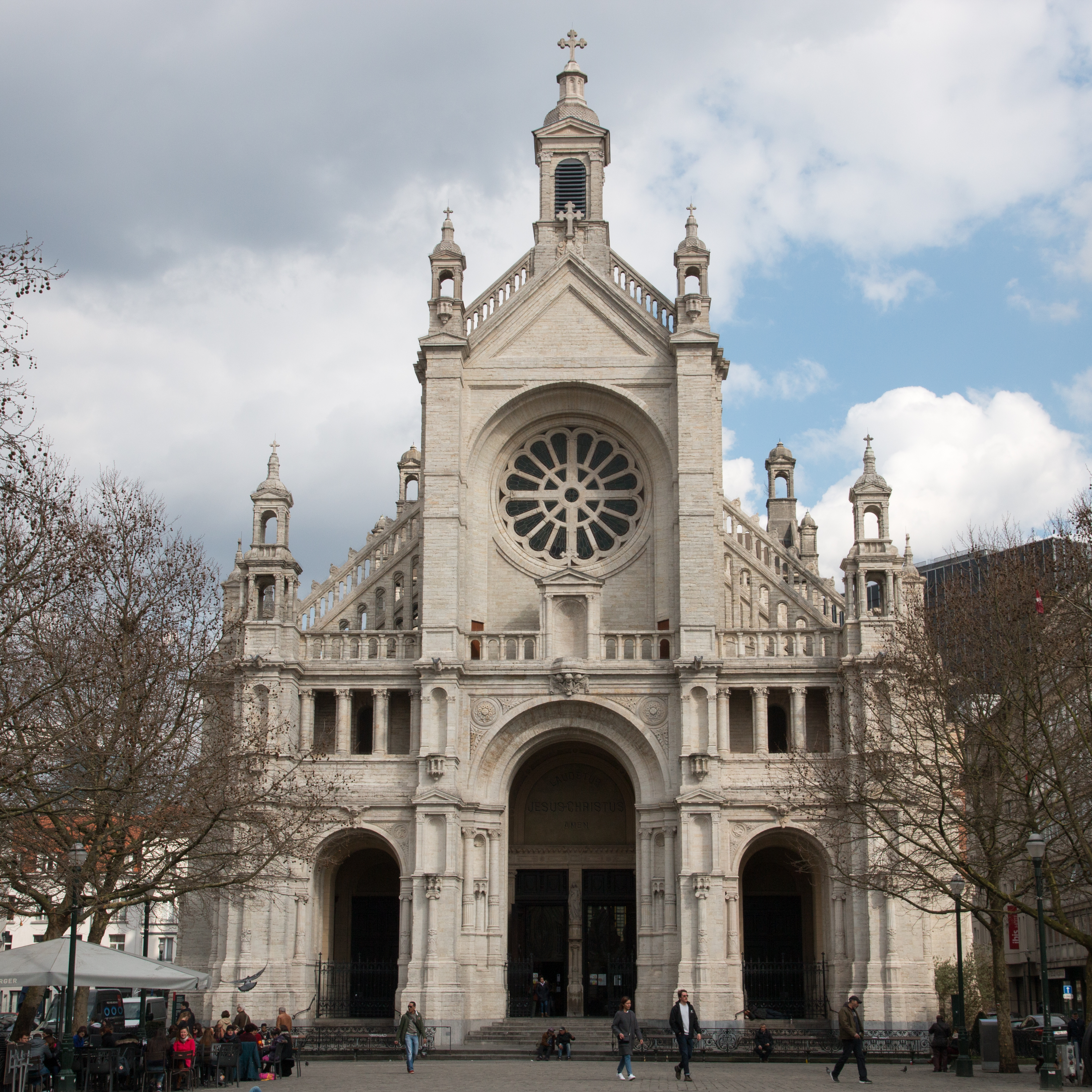
Church of St. Catherine

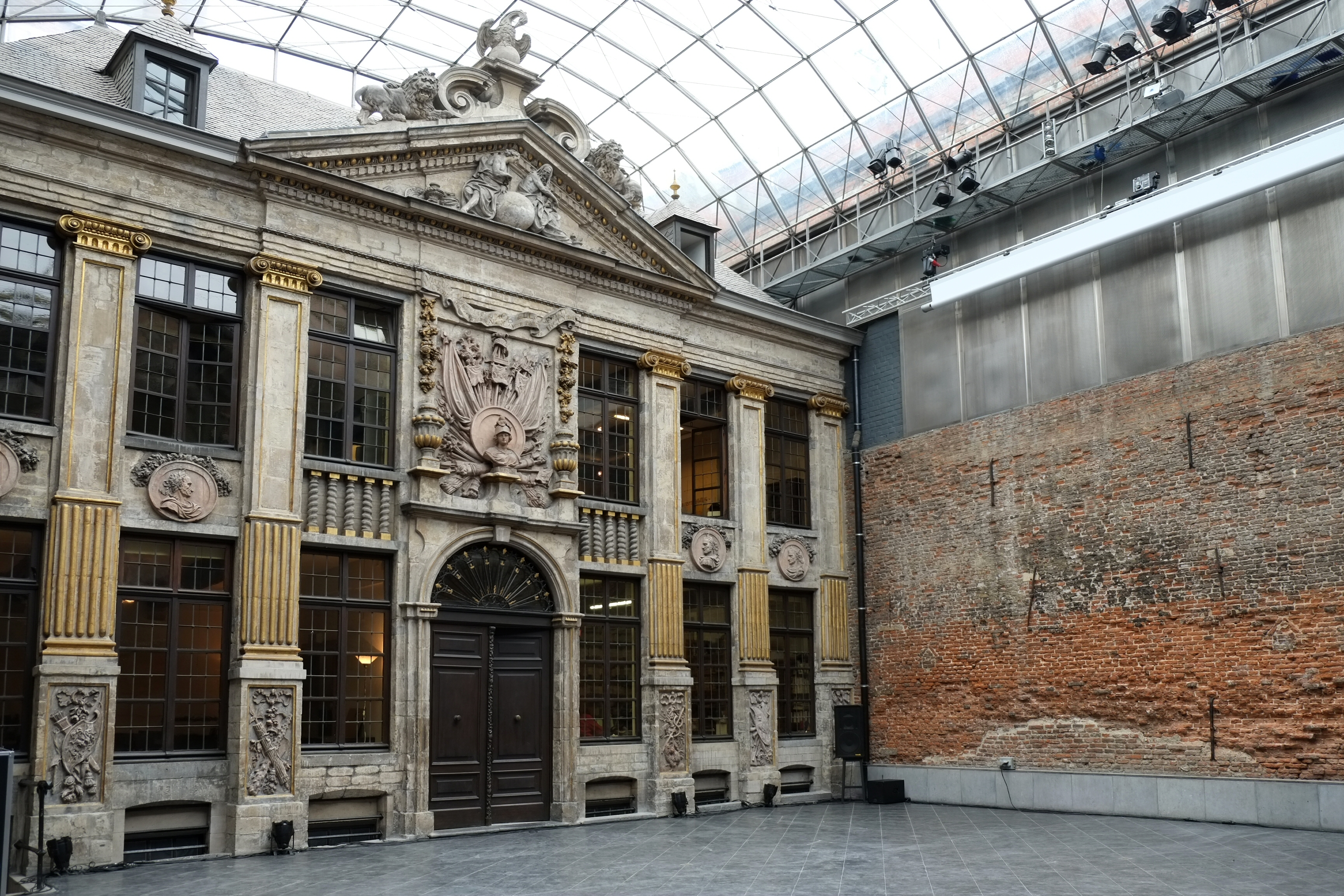
La Bellone

==== Marais–Jacqmain Quarter ====
Few of the buildings in the Marais–Jacqmain Quarter (French: Quartier Marais–Jacqmain, Dutch: Jacqmain–Broekwijk) have escaped 20th-century demolition, from the Boulevard Pachéco/Pachecolaan to the Rue Neuve/Nieuwstraat. They have given way to the State Administrative Centre, press printers, banking facilities, and commercial galleries. The current trend is to restore the neighbourhood's social mix by redeveloping former office buildings into housing. Despite the district's long-time grim aspect, the centuries-old Meyboom tradition has been maintained, and the former Art Nouveau Magasins Waucquez by Victor Horta have been preserved to house, since 1989, the Belgian Comic Strip Center. Another preserved islet is the 18th-century Place des Martyrs/Martelaarsplein in neoclassical style, which has gradually been renovated. The victims of the Belgian Revolution of 1830 are buried there in an open crypt with a memorial. Nearby is the Rue Neuve, one of Belgium's main shopping streets, with more than 1 km (0.62 mi) of stores on both its sides; the Boulevard Adolphe Max/Adolphe Maxlaan, a traditional 19th-century artery; and the Boulevard Émile Jacqmain/Émile Jacqmainlaan (where the Théâtre national Wallonie-Bruxelles has been installed since 2004), close to the Place de Brouckère/De Brouckèreplein. The latter, a very busy square, is dominated at its southern end by two block-style towers, but for the rest, it has totally (Hotel Métropole and its neighbour the Hotel Atlanta) or partially (UGC cinema) retained its old façades.

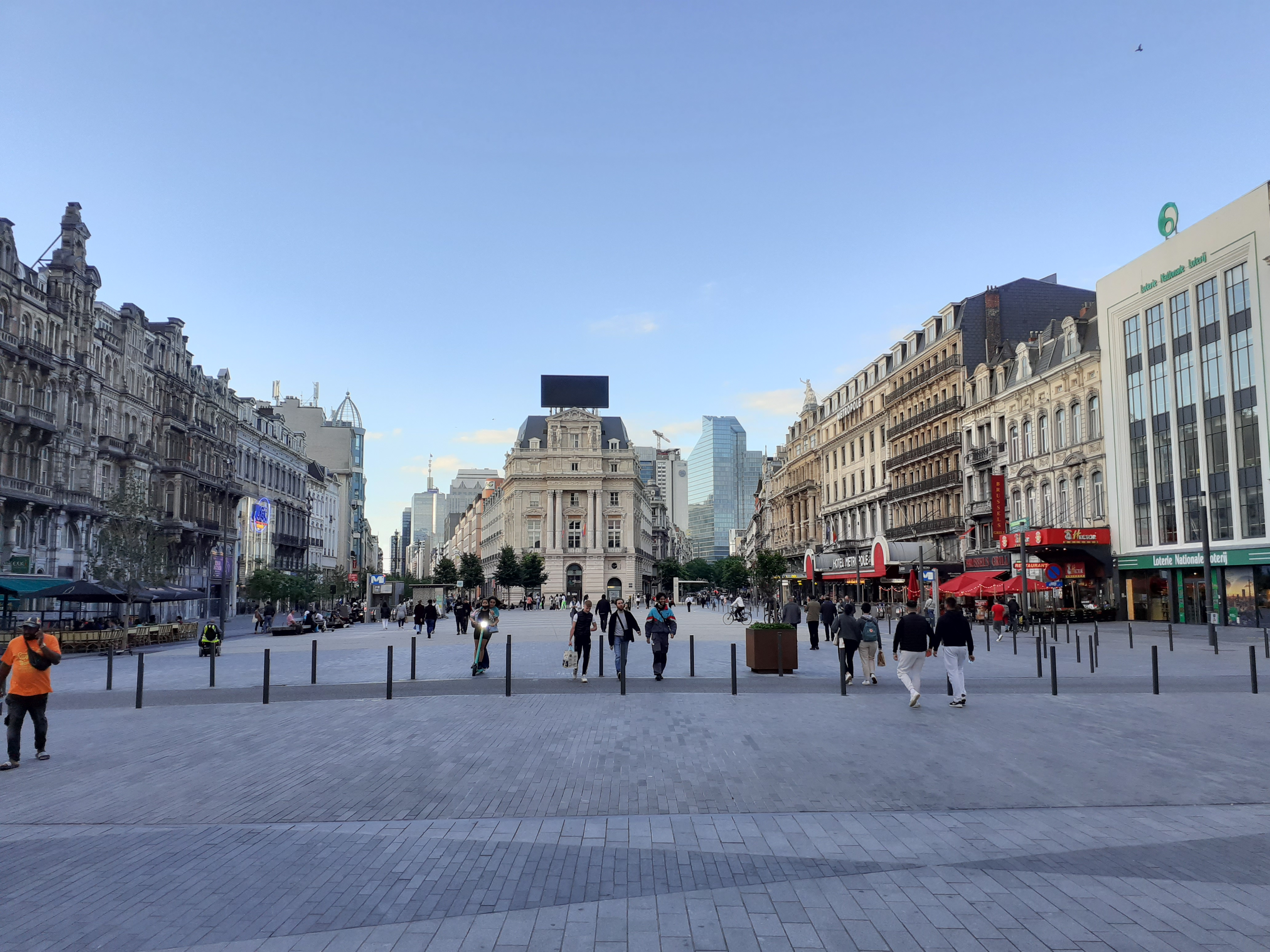
Place de Brouckère/De Brouckèreplein

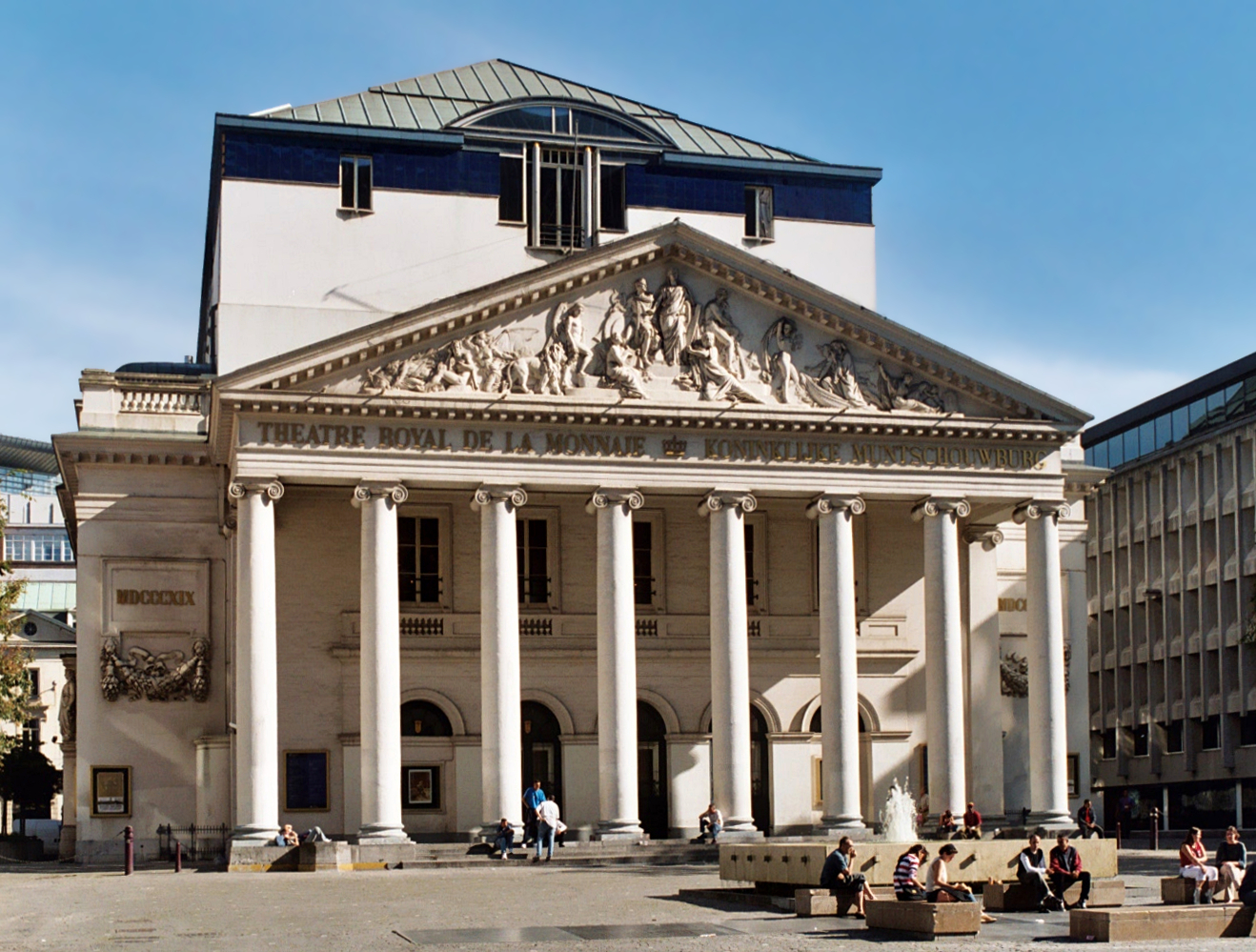
Royal Theatre of La Monnaie

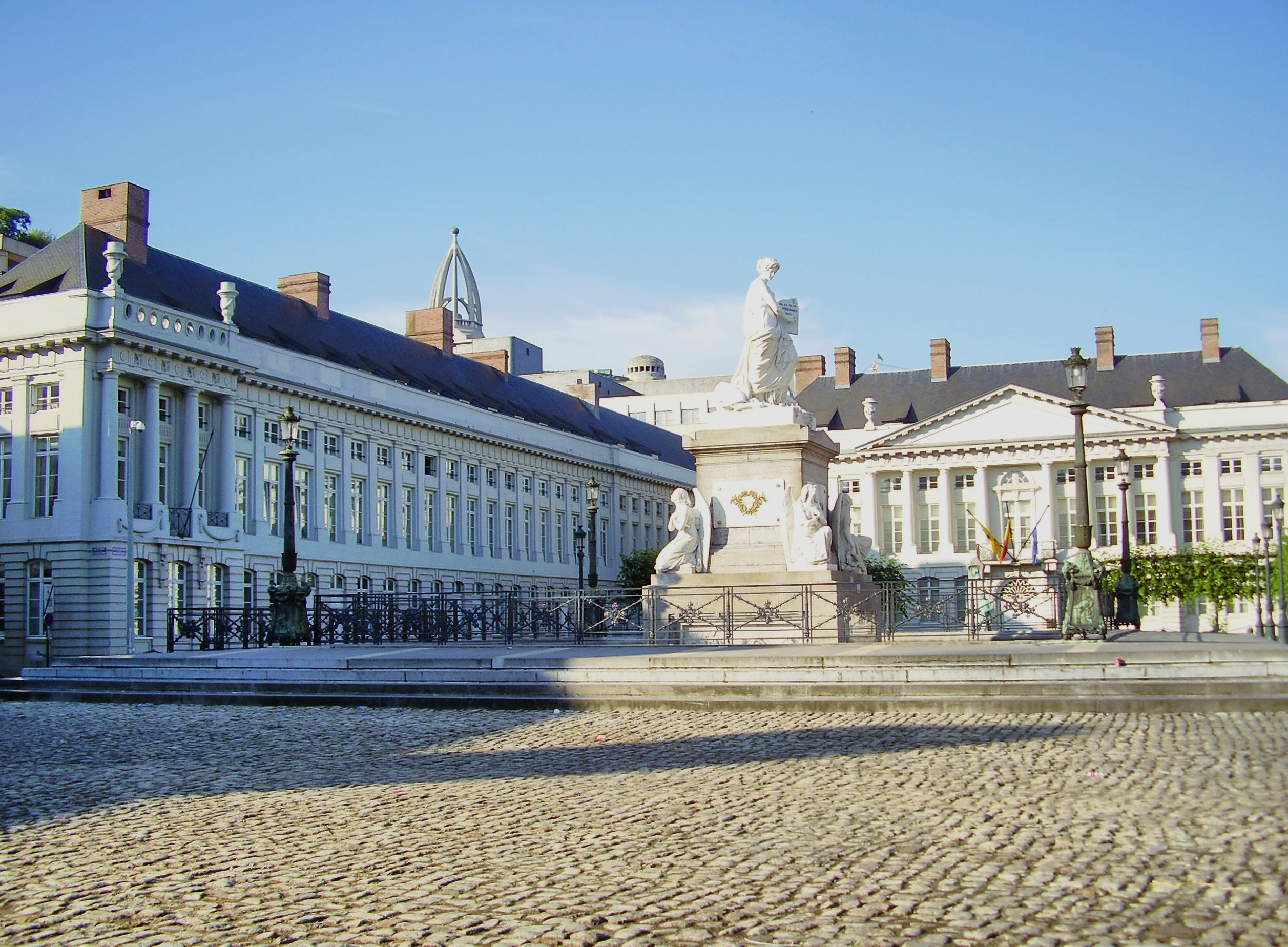
Place des Martyrs/Martelaarsplein

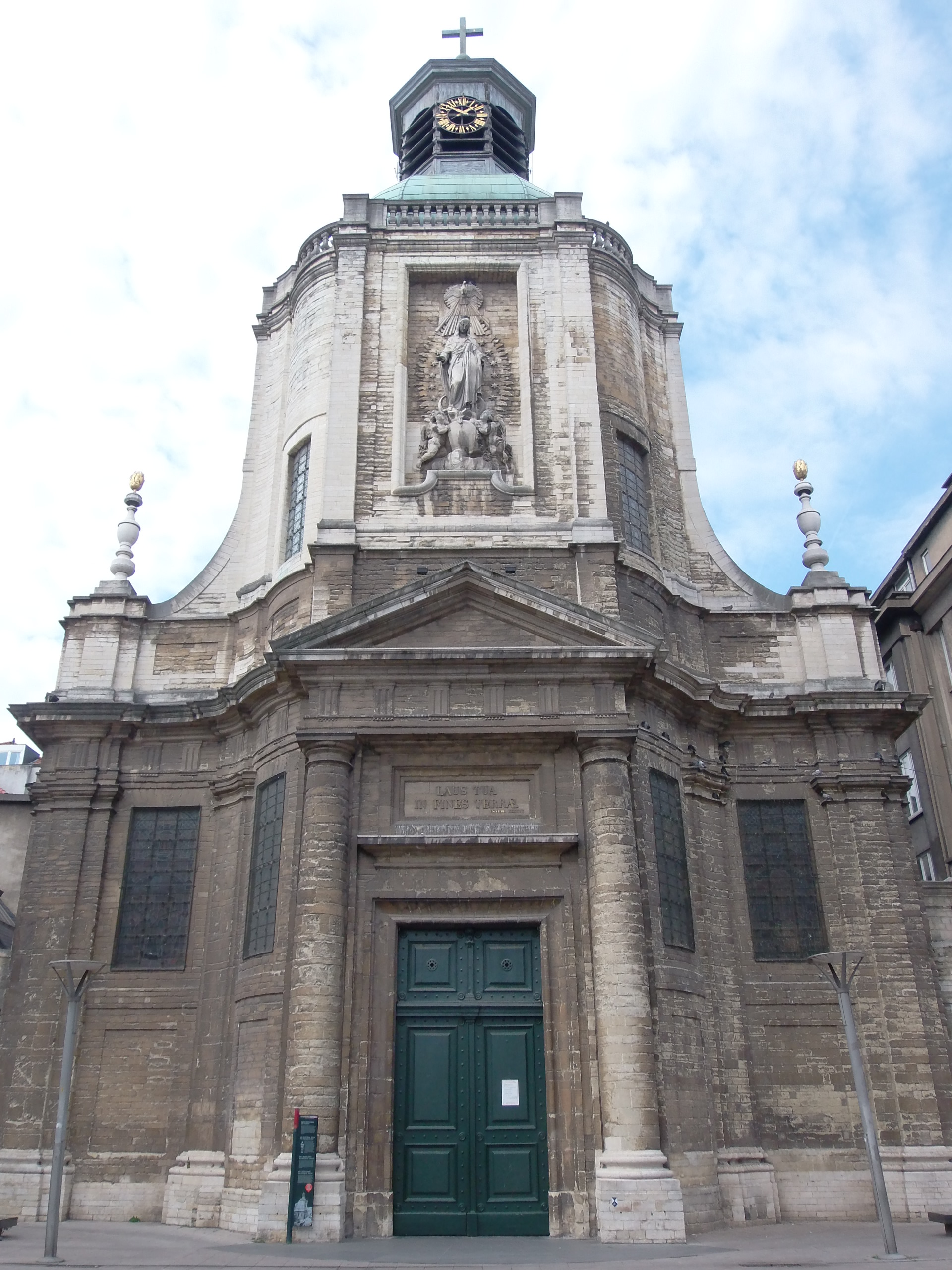
Church of Our Lady of Finisterrae

==== Freedom Quarter ====
The Freedom Quarter (French: Quartier des Libertés, Dutch: Vrijheidswijk) is situated between the Belgian Parliament and the Rue Royale/Koningsstraat, close to the crossroads with the Small Ring. Its focal point is the Congress Column (erected in memory of the National Congress of 1830–31, the founder of democratic liberties in Belgium), under which also lies the tomb of the Unknown Soldier with an eternal flame. Not far from there is the Hotel Astoria, dating from 1911, which has been renovated and enlarged. Until the 19th century, the district was known as Notre-Dame-aux-Neiges/Onze-Lieve-Vrouw-ter-Sneeuw and was predominantly inhabited by working-class people. The authorities' desire to clean up the squalid parts of the city led to the expulsion of the population and the neighbourhood's complete destruction. A new bourgeois district was developed during the last quarter of the century. The choice was made to commemorate Belgian independence: the Place de la Liberté/Vrijheidsplein ("Liberty Square"), the Place des Barricades/Barricadenplein ("Barricades' Square"), the Rue de la Révolution/Revolutiestraat ("Revolution Street"), the Rue du Congrès/Congresstraat ("Congress Street"), etc. The four streets leading off the Place de la Liberté bear the names of the four constitutional liberties, symbolised by four allegorical bronze female sculptures surrounding the Congress Column: Freedom of the Press, Worship, Association and Education. This eclectic urban complex is one of the best preserved in the Pentagon.

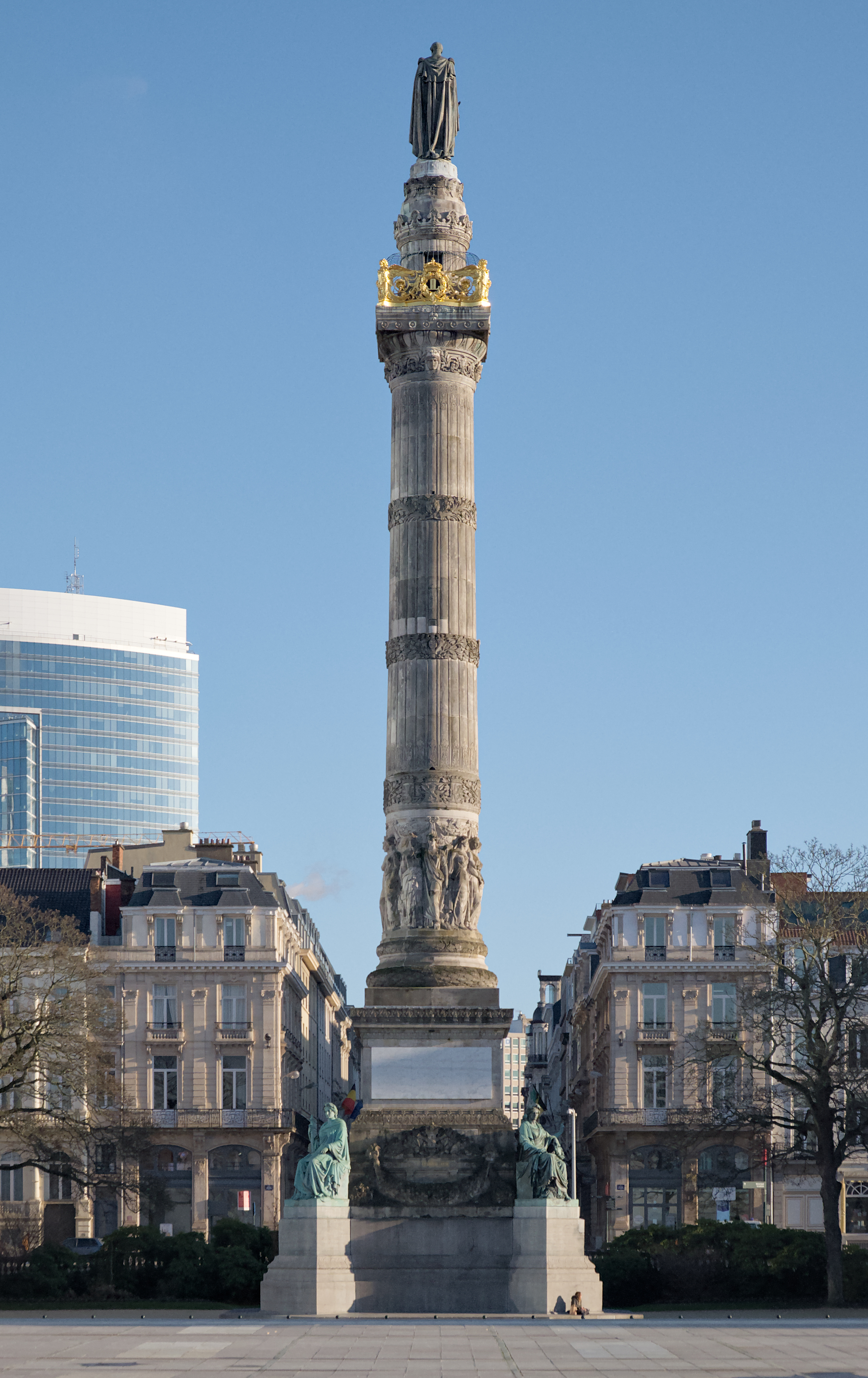
Congress Column (Leopold I, 1859)

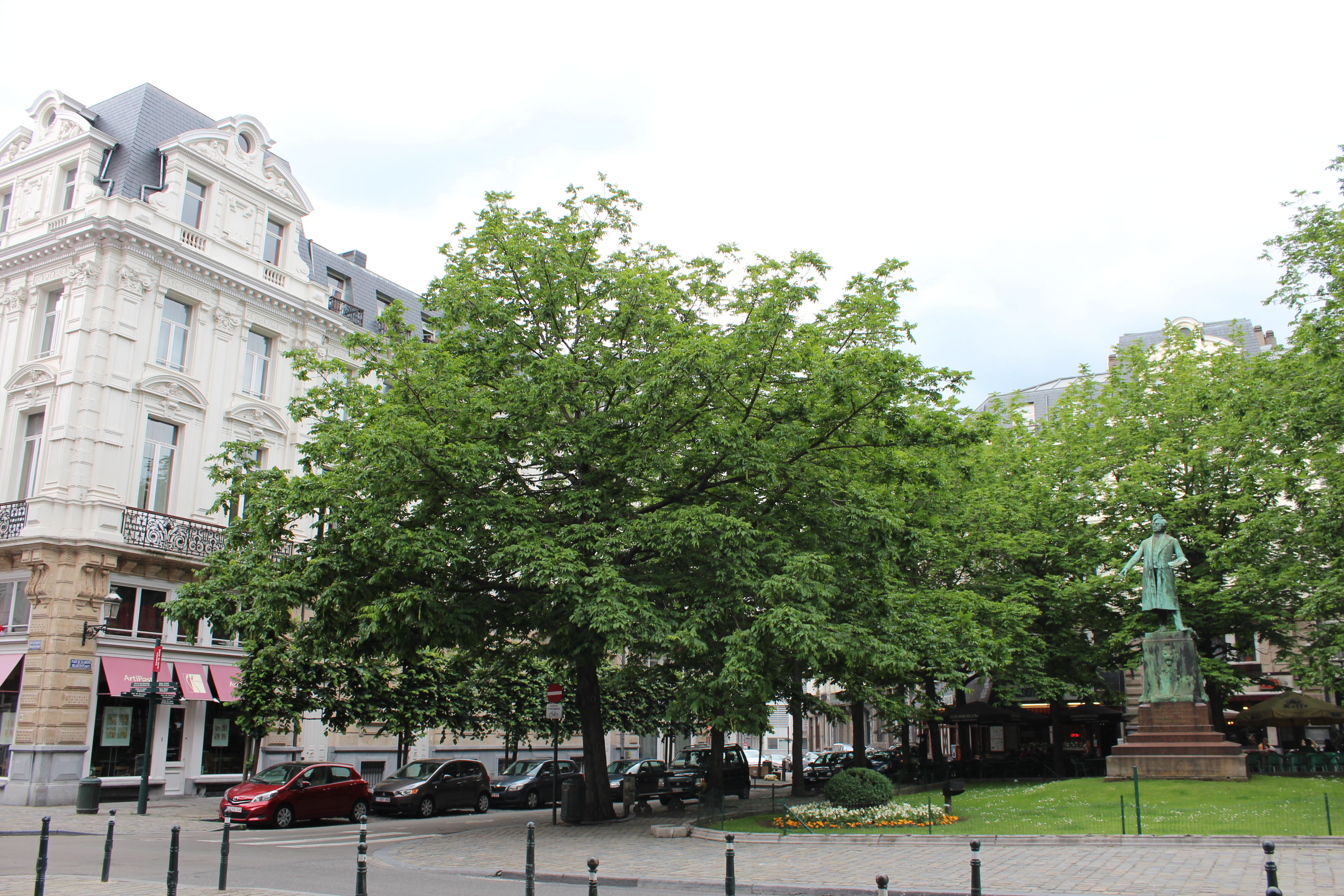
Place de la Liberté/Vrijheidsplein (Charles Rogier)

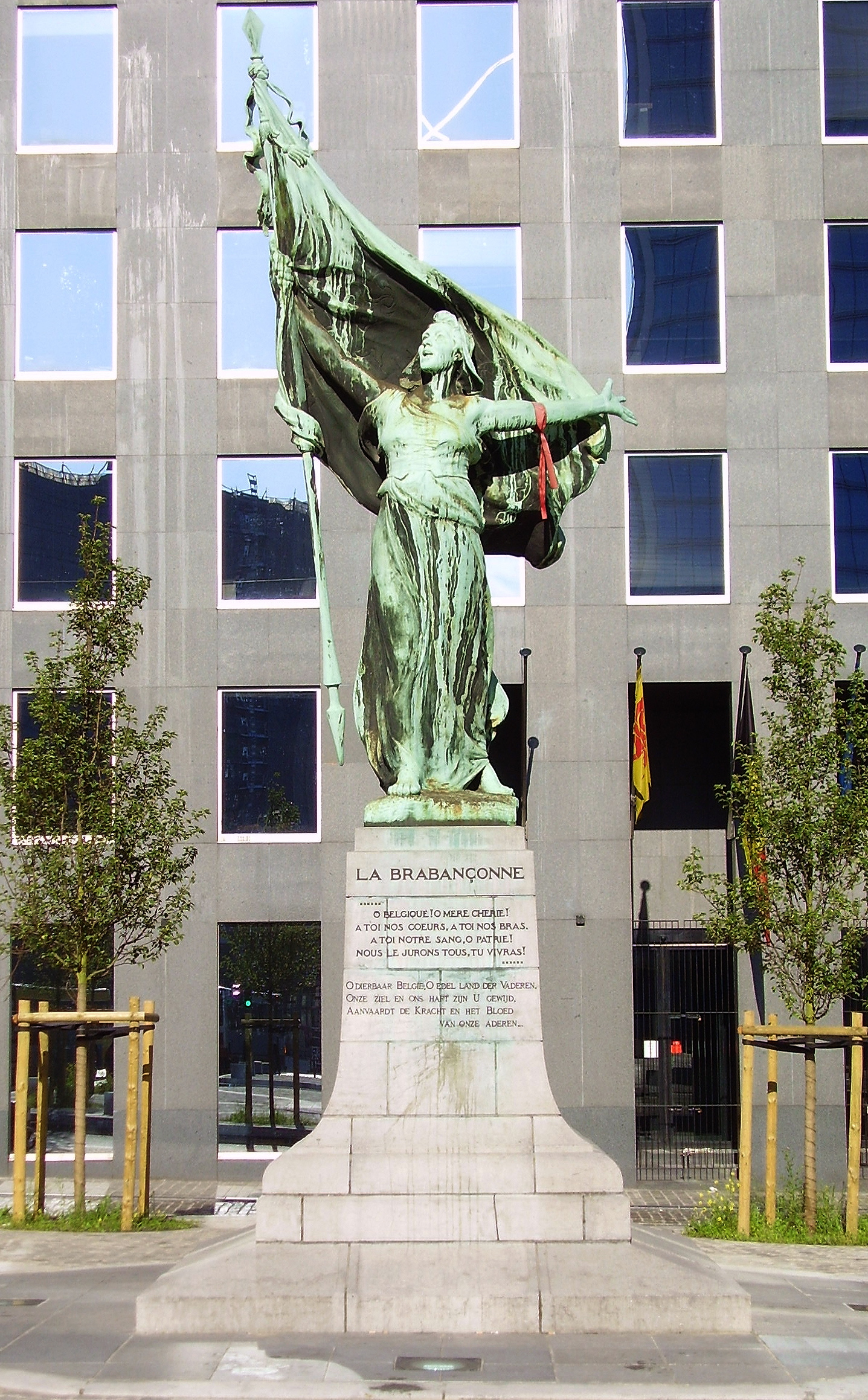
Place Surlet de Chokier/Surlet de Chokierplein (The Brabançonne)

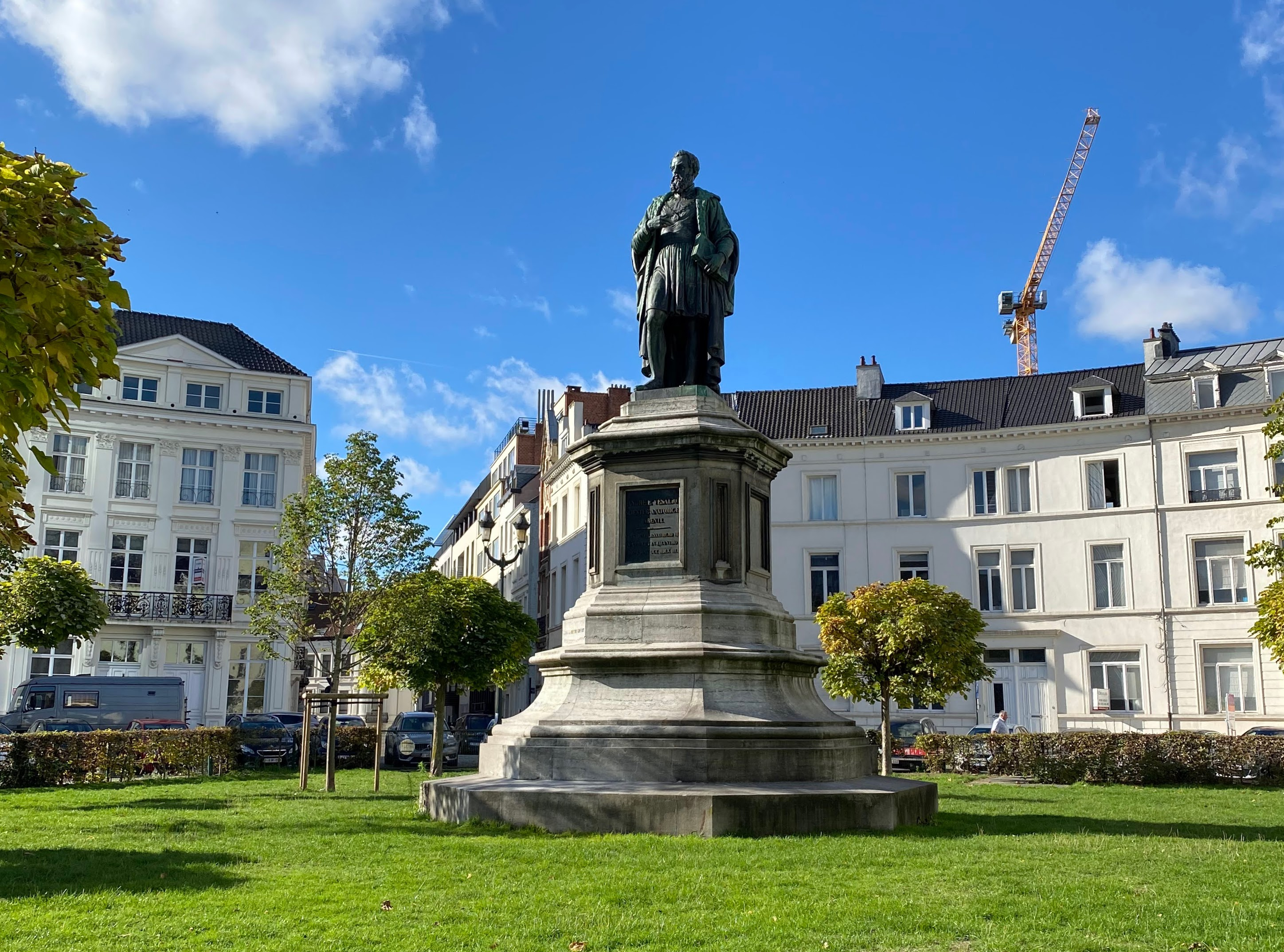
Place des Barricades/Barricadenplein (Andreas Vesalius)

=== Eastern Quarters ===
==== European Quarter and Leopold Quarter ====
The European Quarter (French: Quartier Européen, Dutch: Europese Wijk) is located to the east of the Pentagon, around the Place du Luxembourg/Luxemburgplein and the Robert Schuman Roundabout, and includes the smaller Leopold Quarter (French: Quartier Léopold, Dutch: Leopoldswijk). The European Parliament was built near the Place du Luxembourg, on the site of the former Leopold Quarter railway station, and of which only the central building overlooking the square remains, having been replaced by the underground Brussels-Luxembourg railway station. The European Commission, housed in the Berlaymont building, is located on the Schuman Roundabout, close to Cinquantenaire Park. Across the street stands the Justus Lipsius building and the Europa building (part of the Residence Palace), serving as the seat of the European Council and the Council of the EU. In Leopold Park, the House of European History (HEH) initiates visitors to the social history of the European continent. There is a visitor centre in the main European Parliament building, known as the Parliamentarium, and another smaller one in the Justus Lipsius building for the European Council. It is accessible on certain days, by appointment. Many of the attractions in the European Quarter are free to visit.

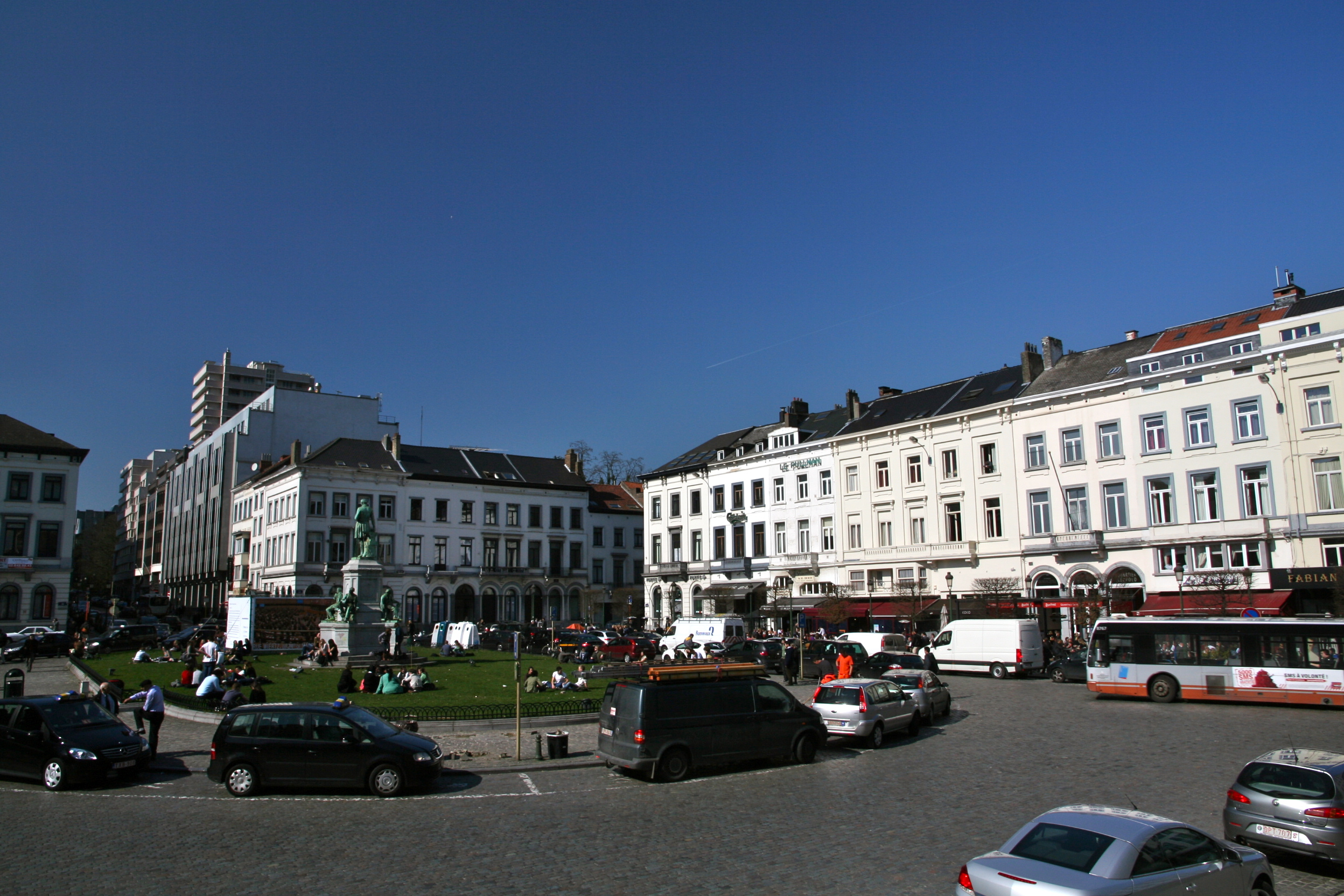
Place du Luxembourg/Luxemburgplein

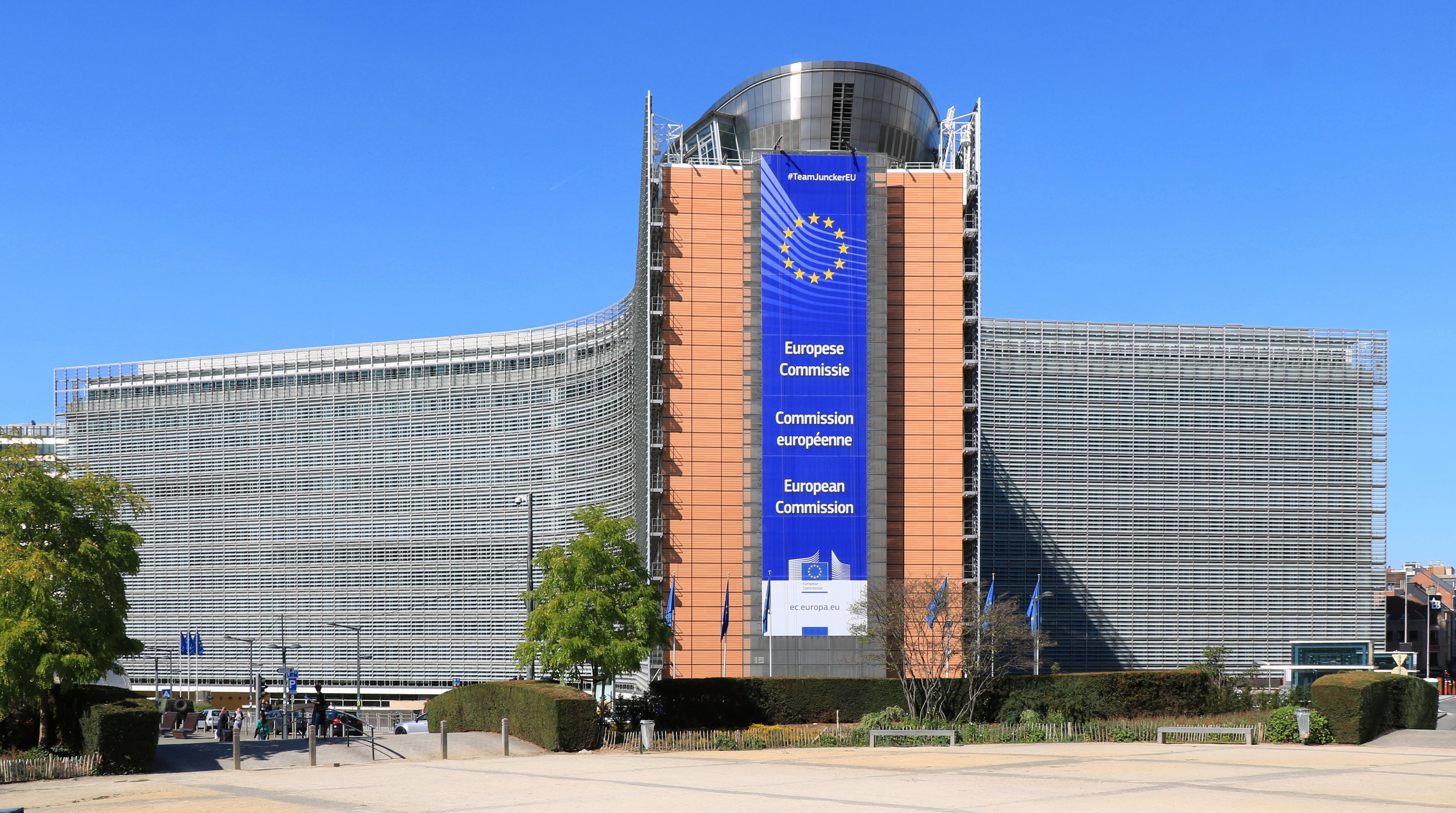
Berlaymont building (European Commission)

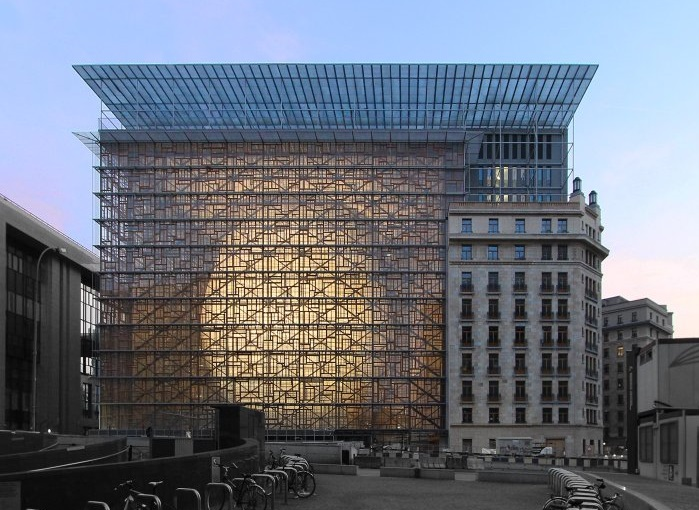
Europa building (European Council)

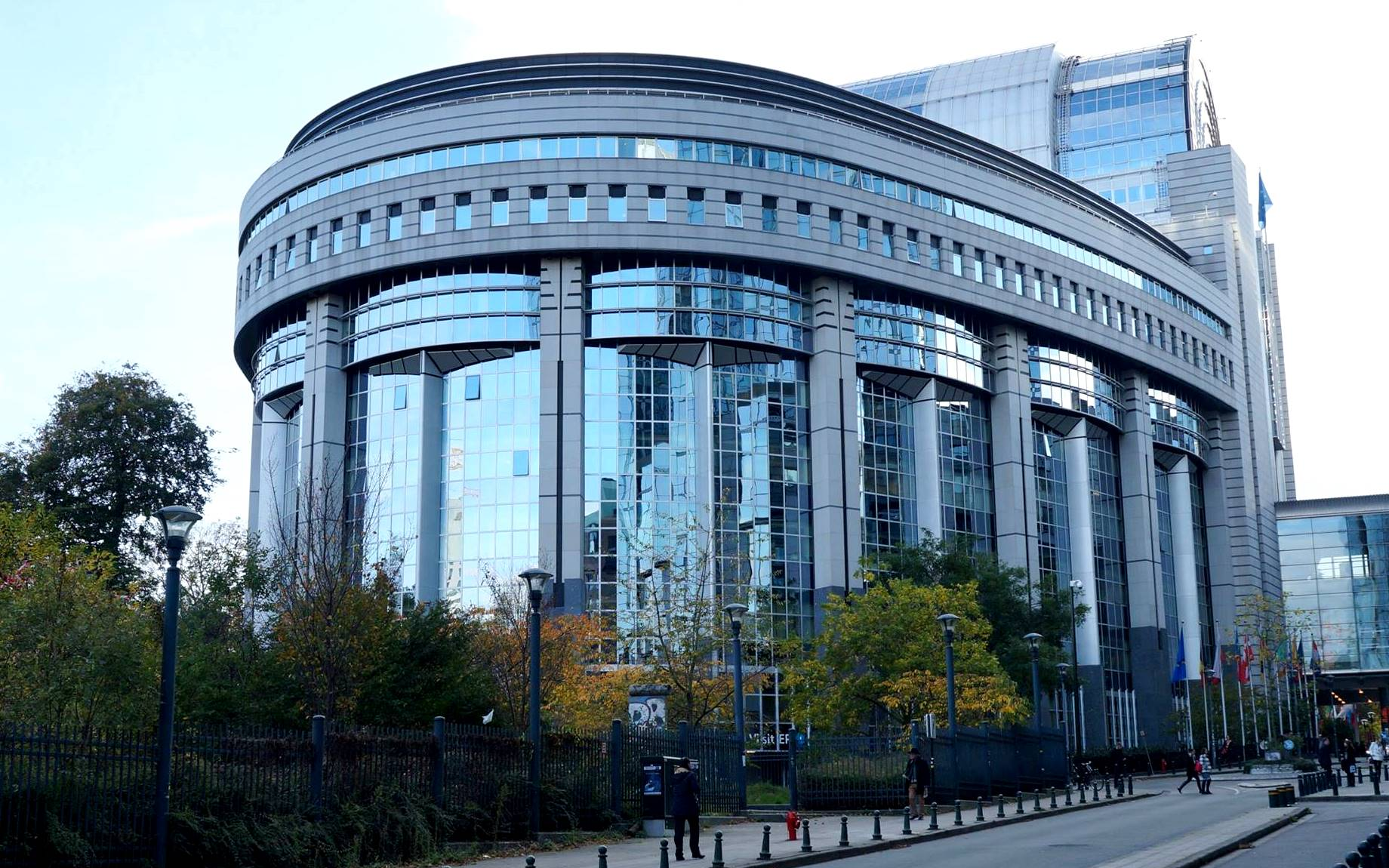
Espace Léopold buildings (European Parliament)

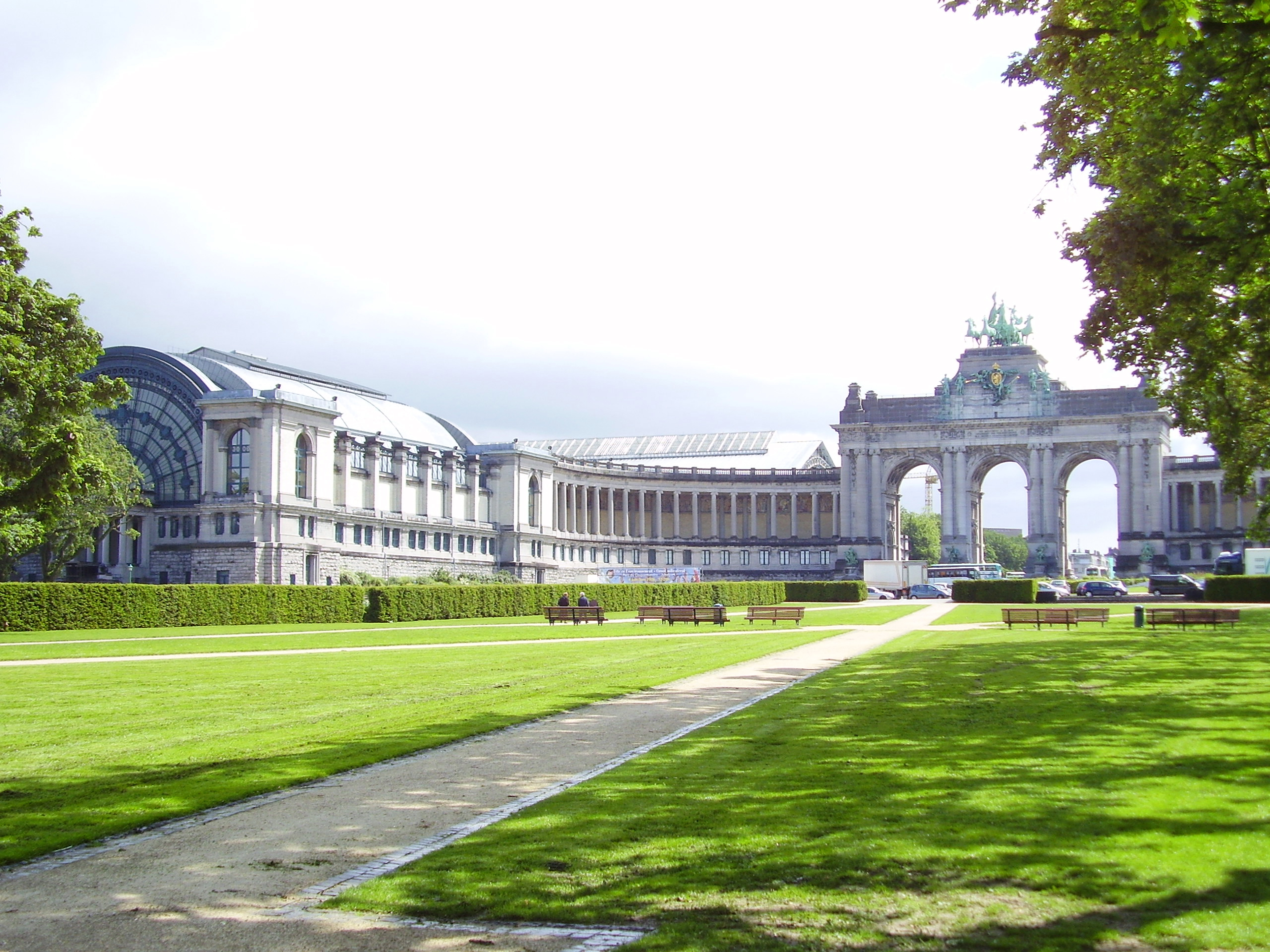
Parc du Cinquantenaire/Jubelpark

==== Squares Quarter ====
The Squares Quarter (French: Quartier des Squares, Dutch: Squareswijk) is the northern spur of the European Quarter, located between Saint-Josse-ten-Noode and the Leopold Quarter. The district is bounded by the Chaussée de Louvain/Leuvensesteenweg to the north, the Rue du Noyer/Notelaarsstraat and the Avenue de Cortenbergh/Kortenberglaan to the east, the Rue Joseph II/Jozef II-straat and the Rue Stevin/Stevinstraat to the south, as well as the Small Ring to the west. The toponym refers to the many squares in the area, in particular the Square Ambiorix/Ambiorixsquare, the Square Marguerite/Margaretasquare, the Square Marie-Louise/Maria-Louizasquare and the Avenue Palmerston/Palmerstonlaan. The area between the Small Ring and the Square Marie-Louise is sometimes considered to be part of the Leopold Quarter.

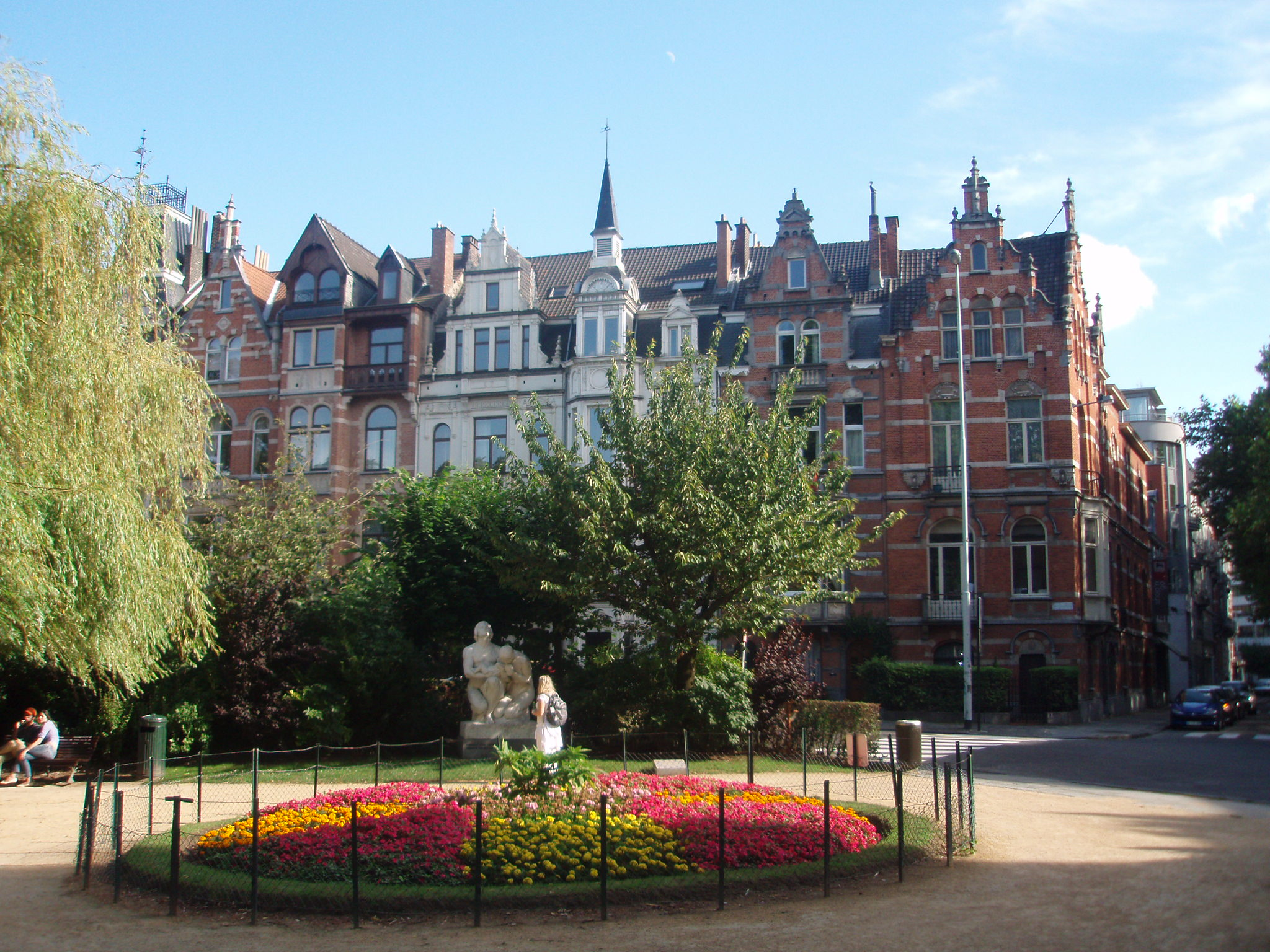
Square Marie-Louise/Maria-Louizasquare

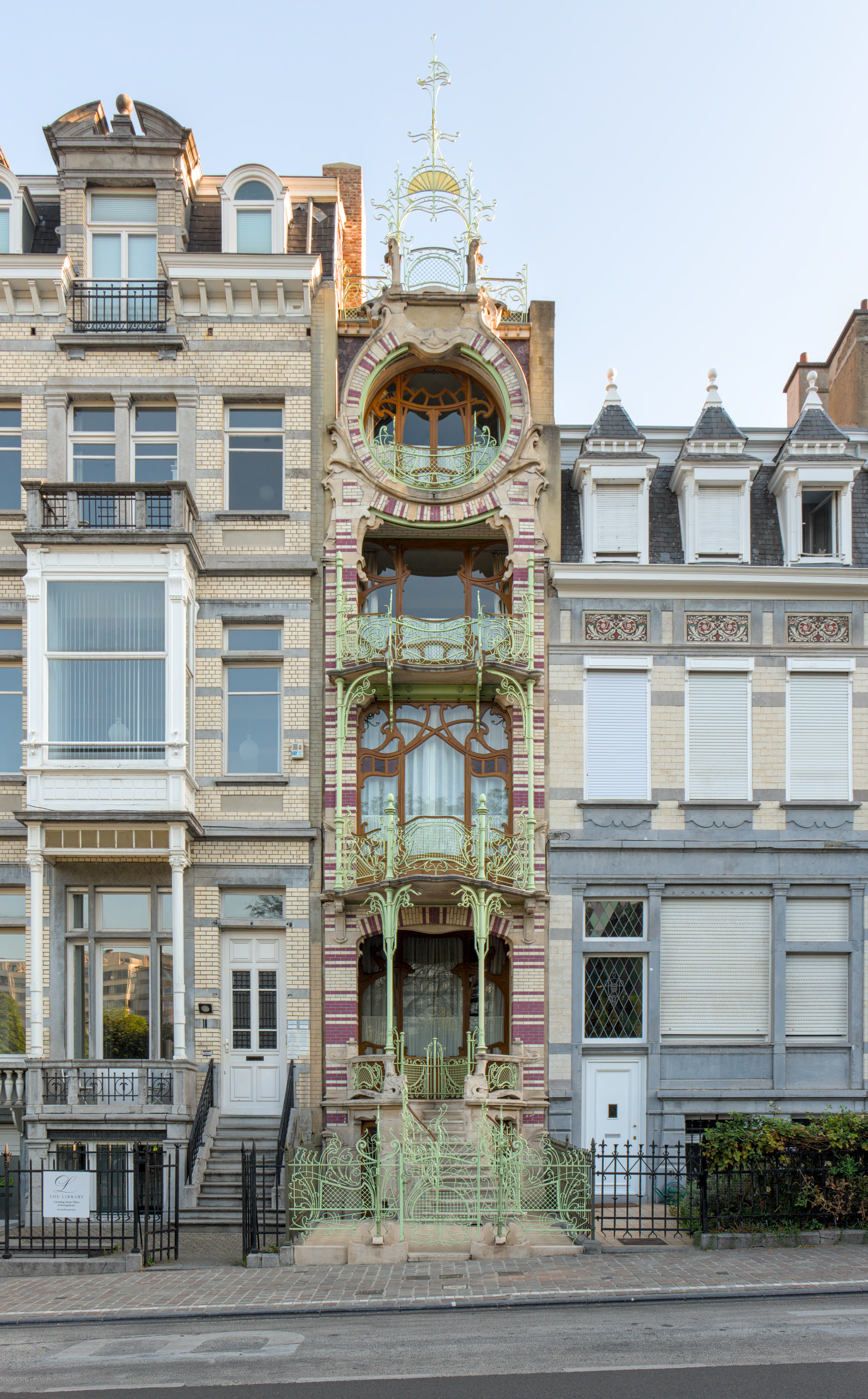
Saint-Cyr House

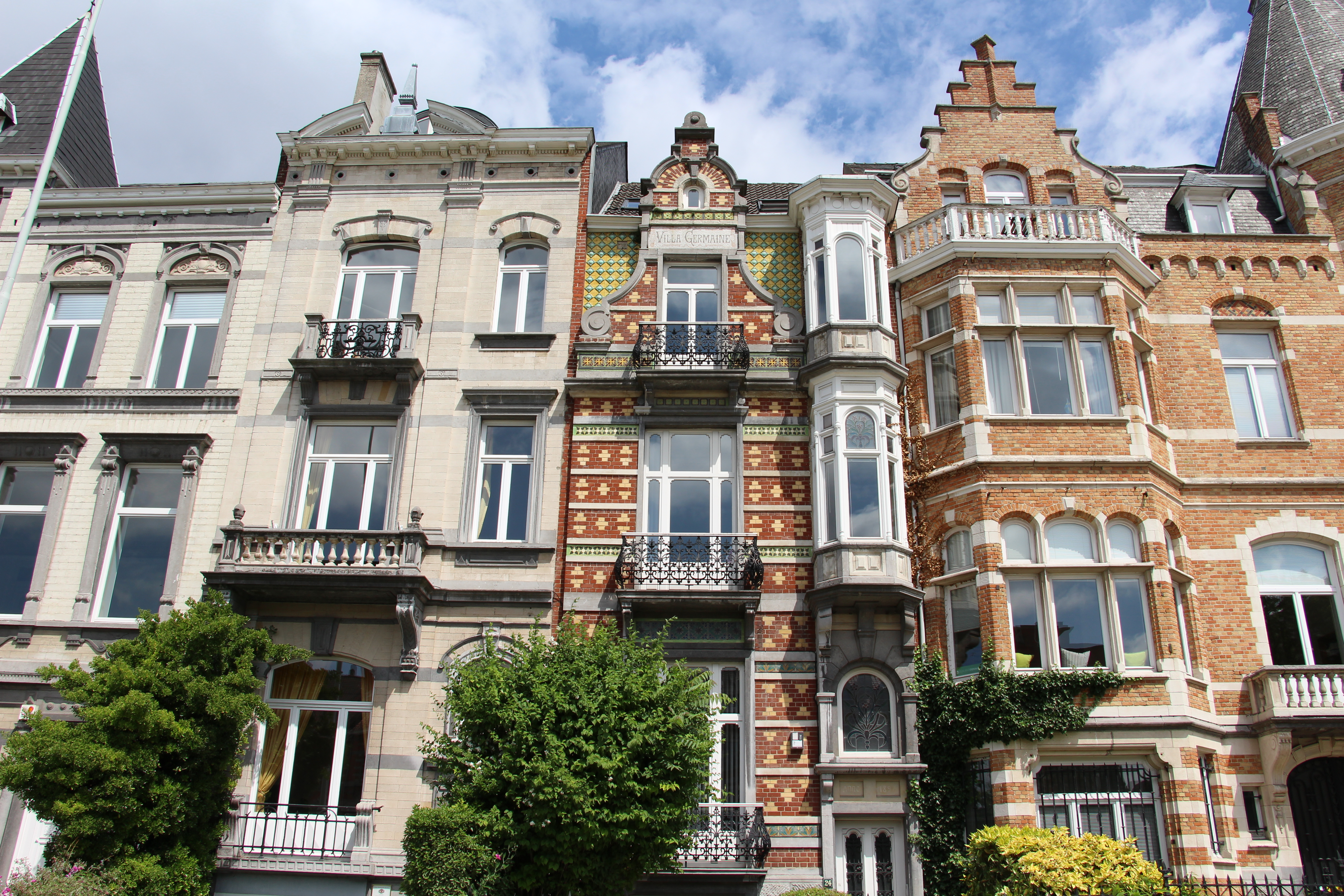
Avenue Palmerston/Palmerstonlaan

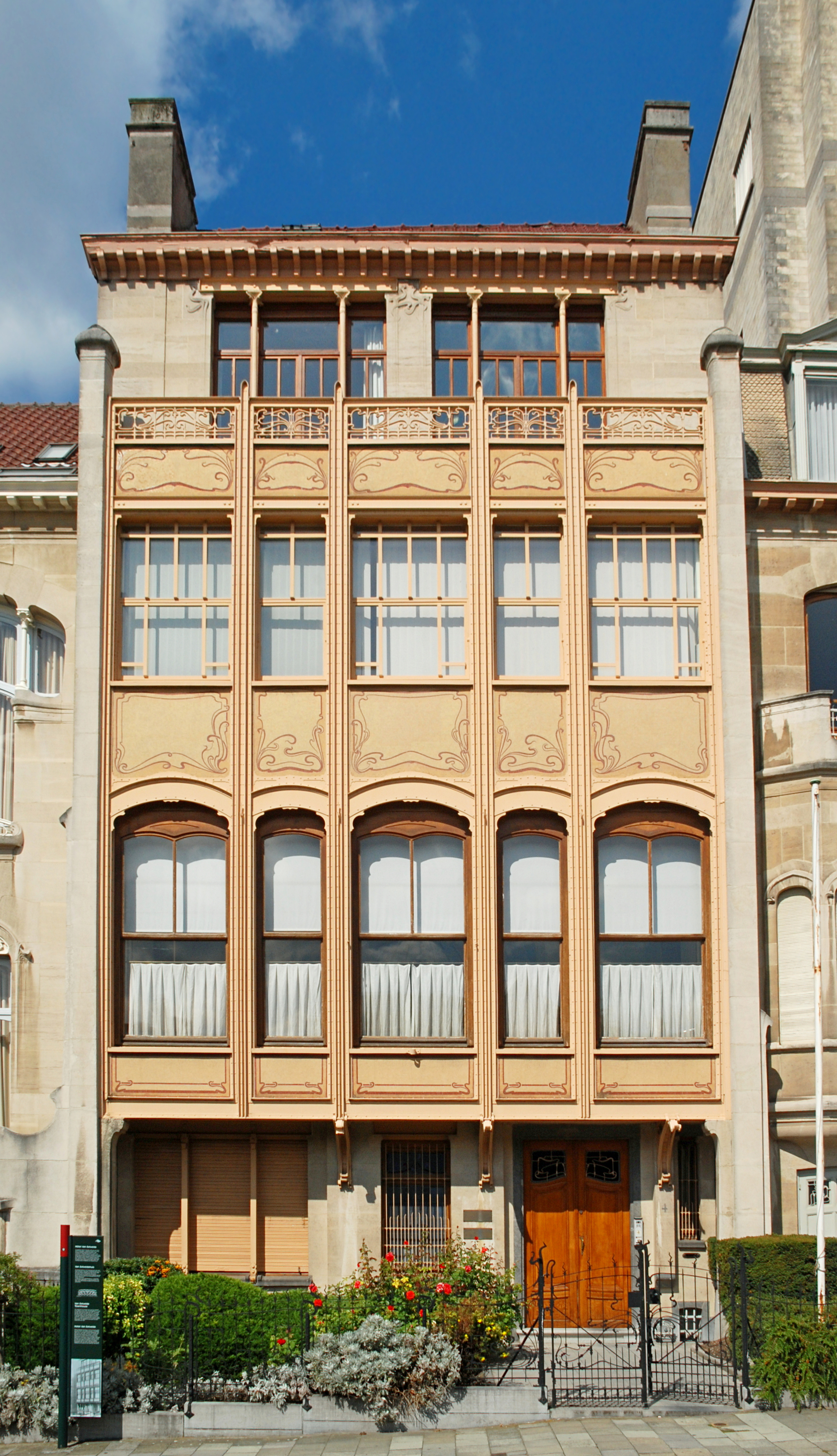
Hôtel van Eetvelde

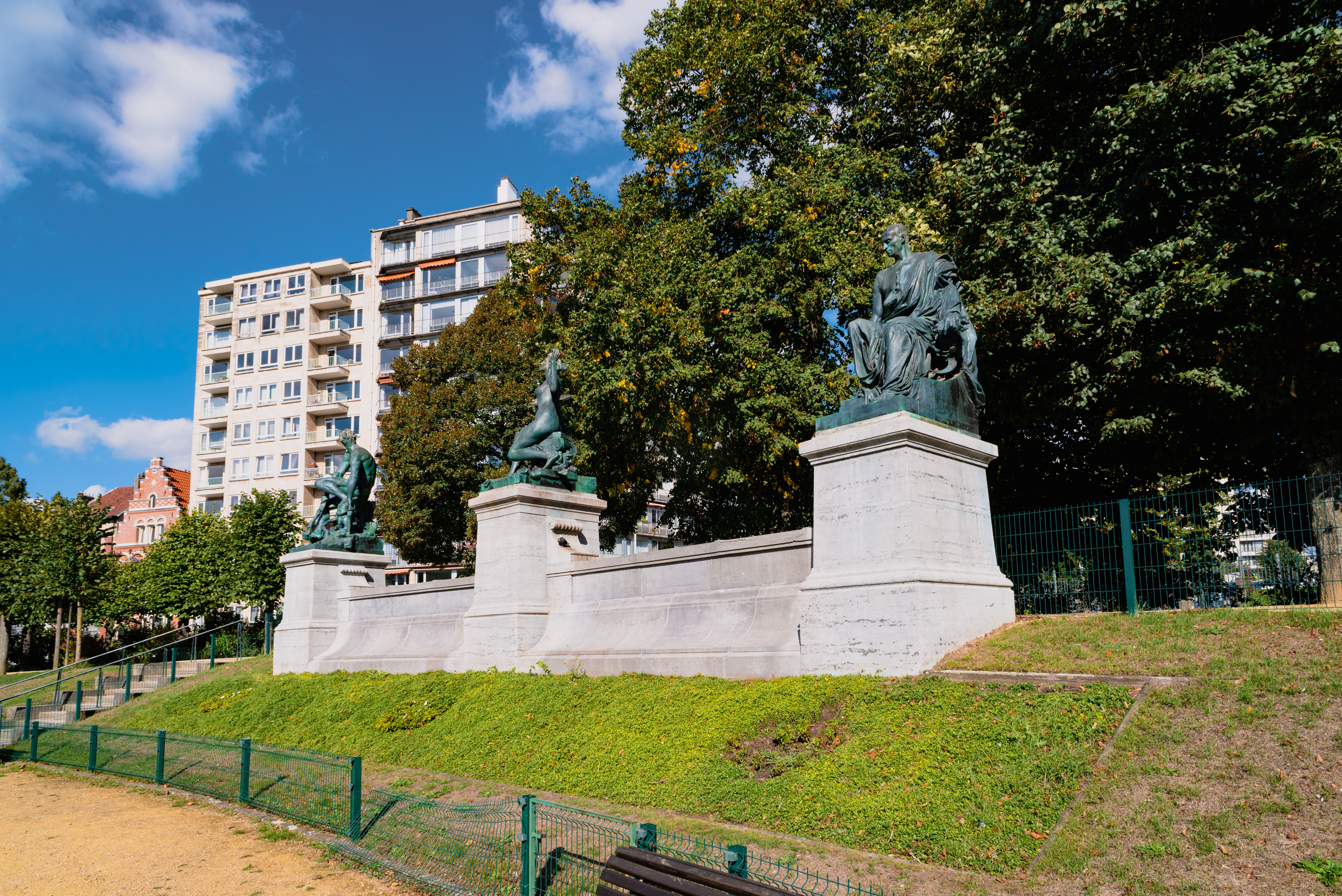
Square Ambiorix/Ambiorixsquare

=== Northern Quarters ===
==== Laeken/Laken ====
Laeken is a former municipality in the north of the Brussels-Capital Region, annexed by the City of Brussels in 1921. Its history is closely associated with the Belgian monarchy, particularly after the establishment of the royal residence there in the late 18th century. Today, it is a diverse district, combining residential and commercial areas, extensive parks and green spaces, as well as former industrial sites near the Brussels–Scheldt Maritime Canal. It is particularly renowned for the Palace of Laeken, the official residence of the Belgian monarch, as well as the Royal Greenhouses of Laeken, within the Royal Domain of Laeken. It is also home to, among others, the Church of Our Lady of Laeken (whose crypt contains the tombs of the Belgian royal family), which is surrounded by Laeken Cemetery, known for the abundance of its funerary heritage. Moreover, the nearby Port of Brussels, next to which the Monument to Work by Constantin Meunier was erected, forms part of the industrial landscape of northern Brussels.

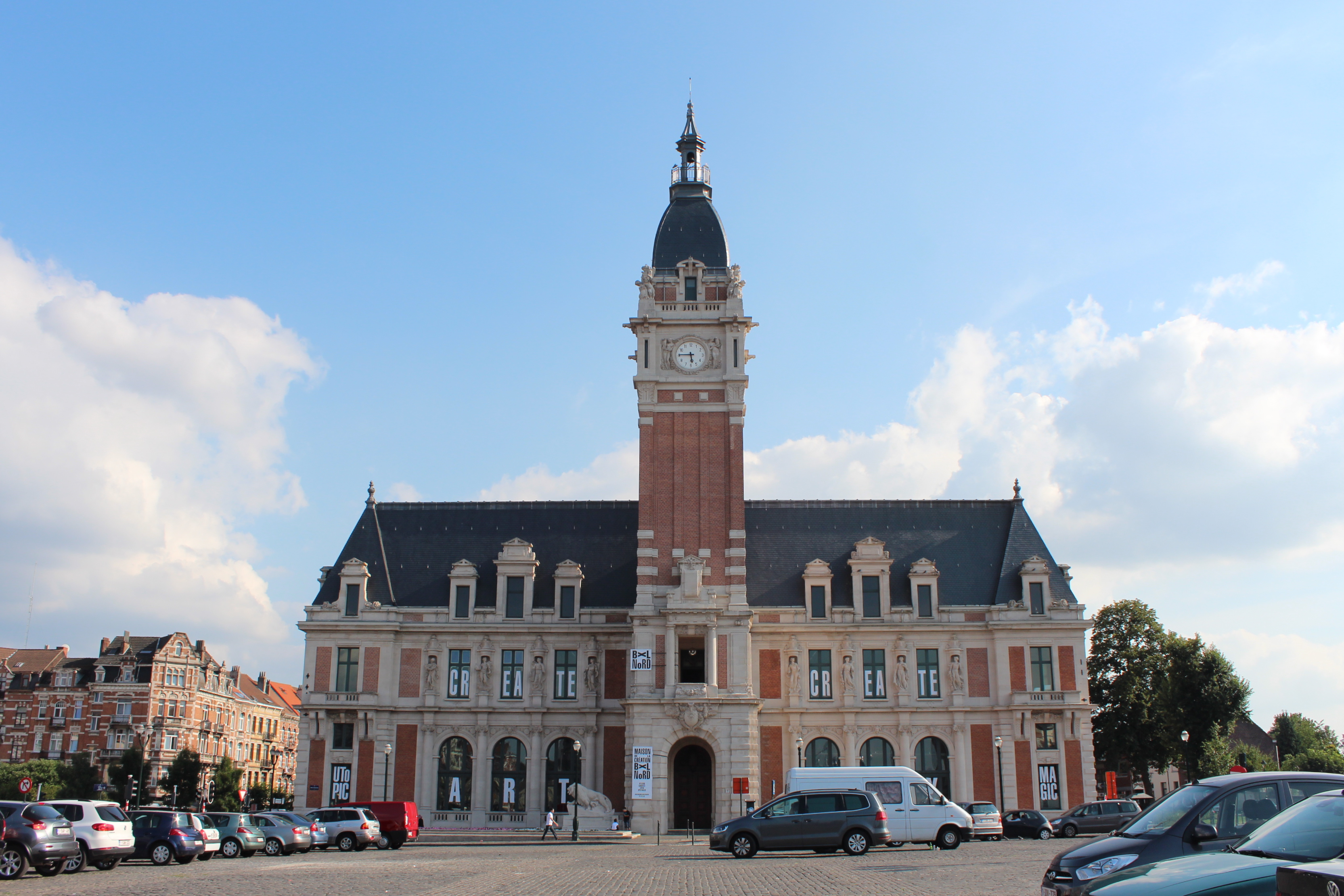
Former Municipal Hall of Laeken

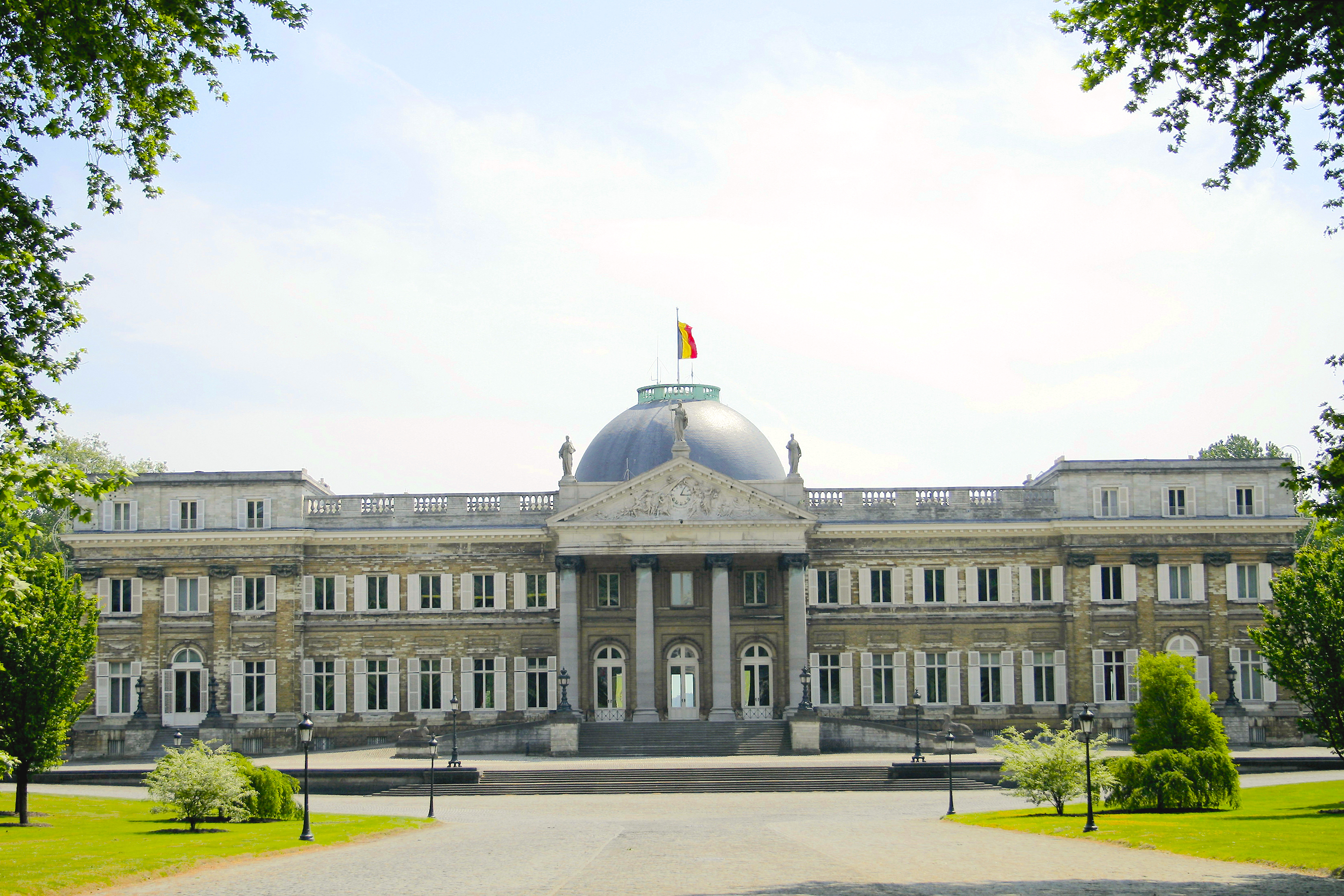
Palace of Laeken

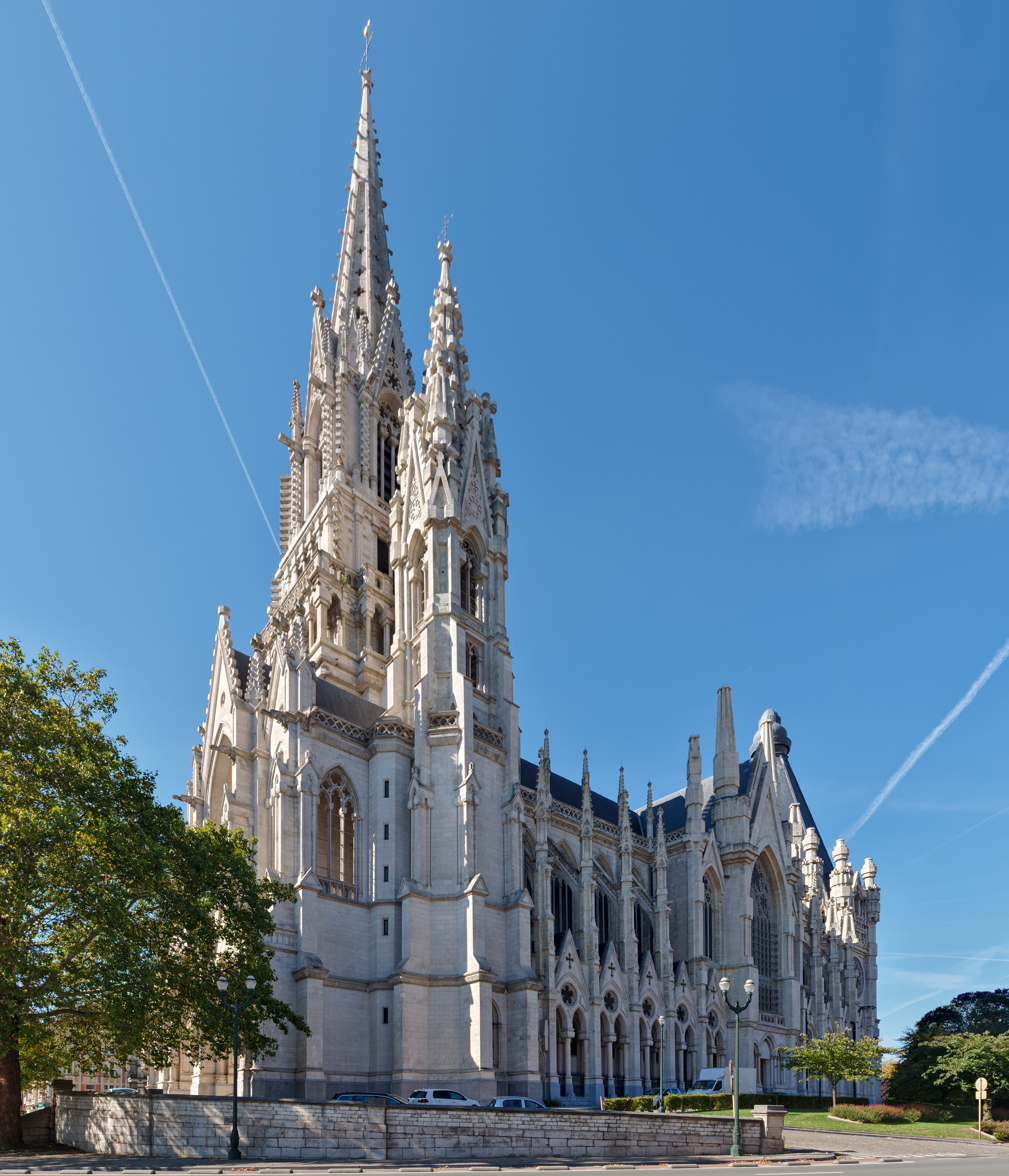
Church of Our Lady of Laeken

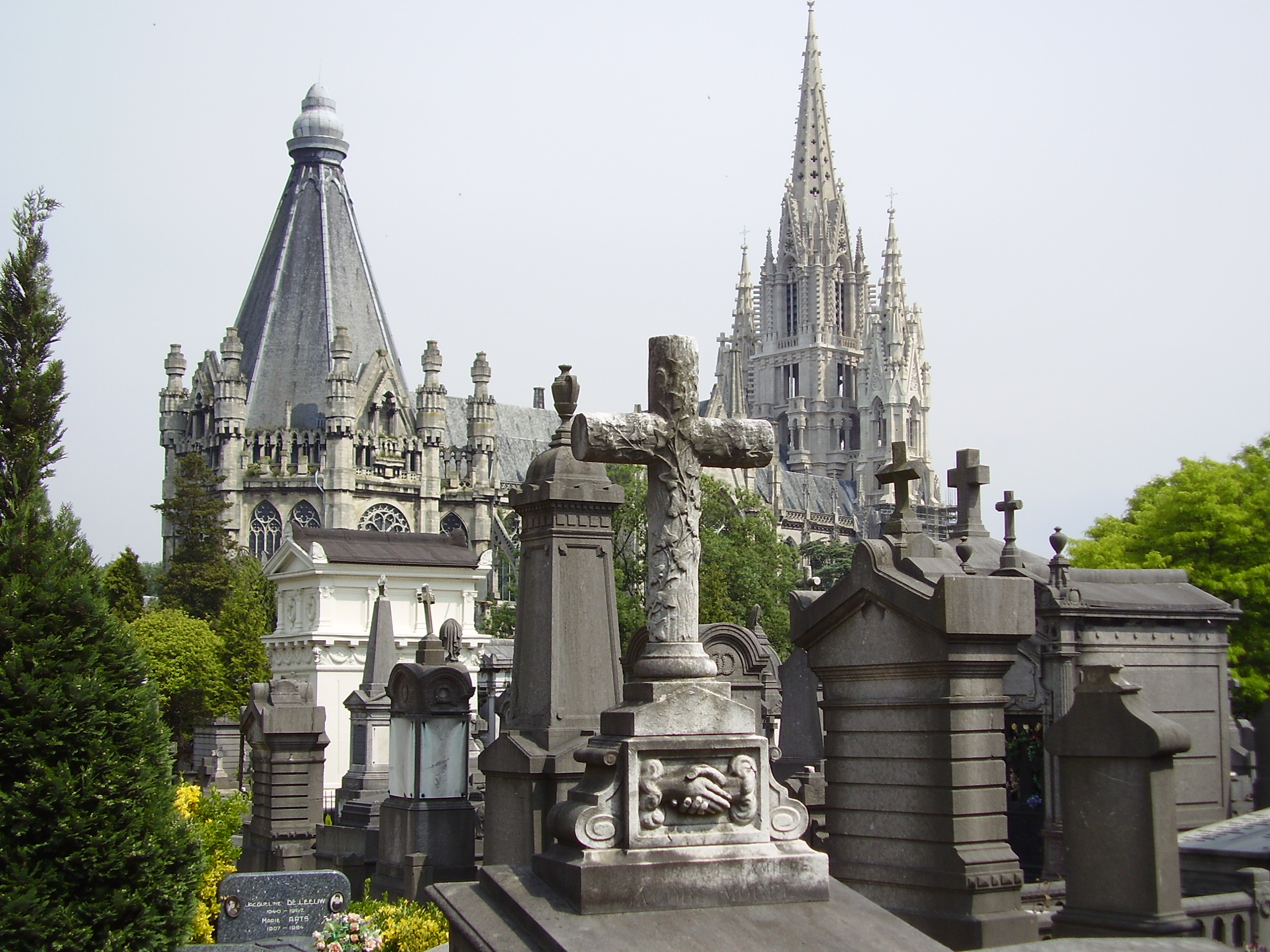
Laeken Cemetery

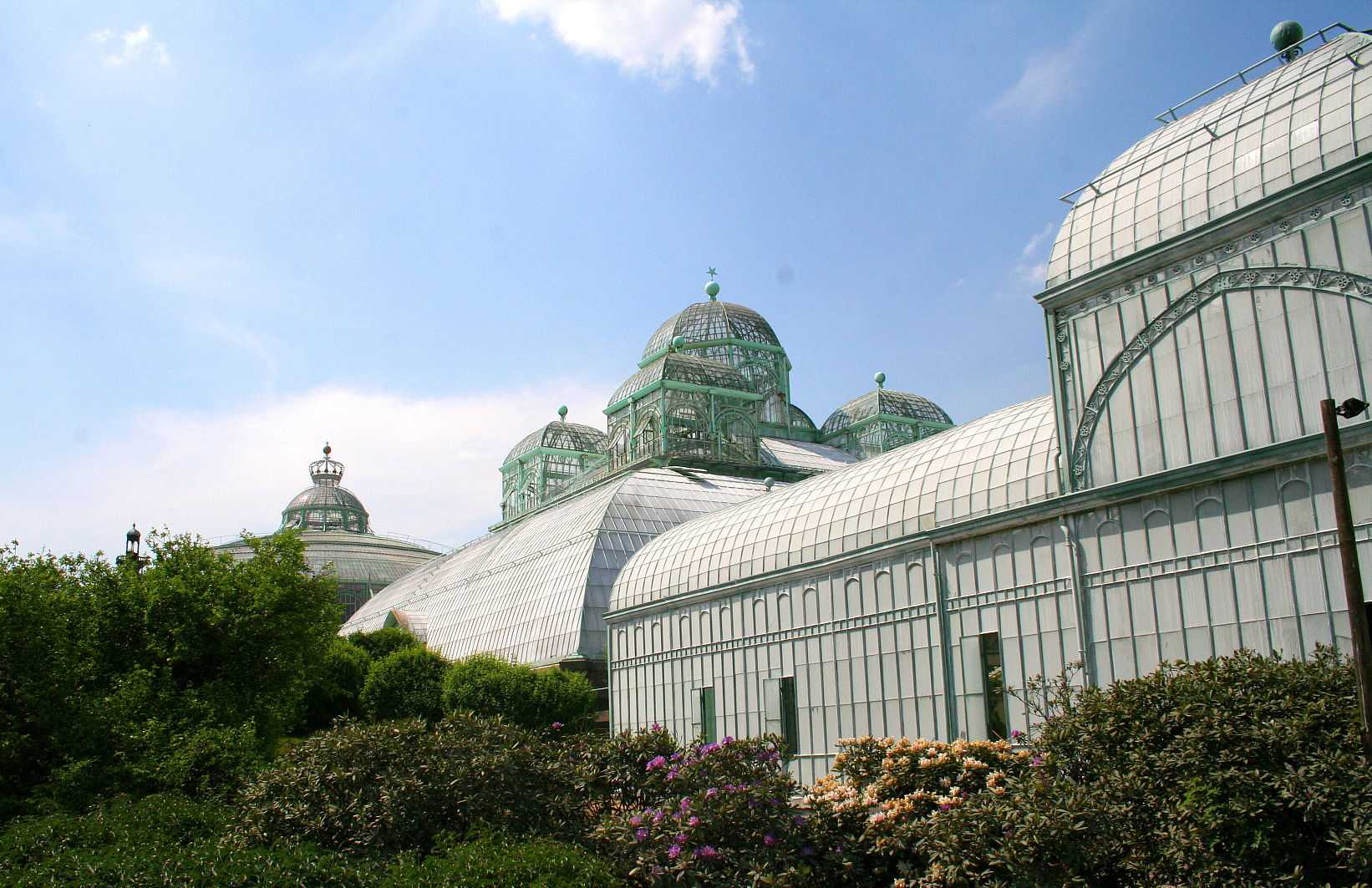
Royal Greenhouses of Laeken

==== Heysel/Heizel ====
In the northern part of Laeken lies the Heysel/Heizel Plateau, the site of the world's fairs of 1935 and 1958, which left a lasting architectural and cultural mark on the area. Today, the plateau and its surroundings form a large complex of recreational facilities, exhibition venues, cultural institutions, and tourist attractions. The Atomium, a symbolic 102-metre-tall (335 ft) modernist structure, originally built for Expo 58, is the most impressive monument on the Heysel Plateau and is now considered a landmark of Brussels. Opposite it, the Centenary Palace is one of the lasting remaining buildings of the 1935 World's Fair and is now home to the Brussels Exhibition Centre (Brussels Expo), the city's most important event complex in Belgium and the largest exhibition space in the Benelux. The site includes the King Baudouin Stadium, a concert and competition facility with a 50,000 seat capacity, the largest in Belgium. The Bruparck entertainment park (with among others Mini-Europe miniature park and Kinepolis cinema) and the Planetarium of the Royal Observatory of Belgium are also located there, as is the Palais 12/Paleis 12, a large and modern multiuse indoor arena.

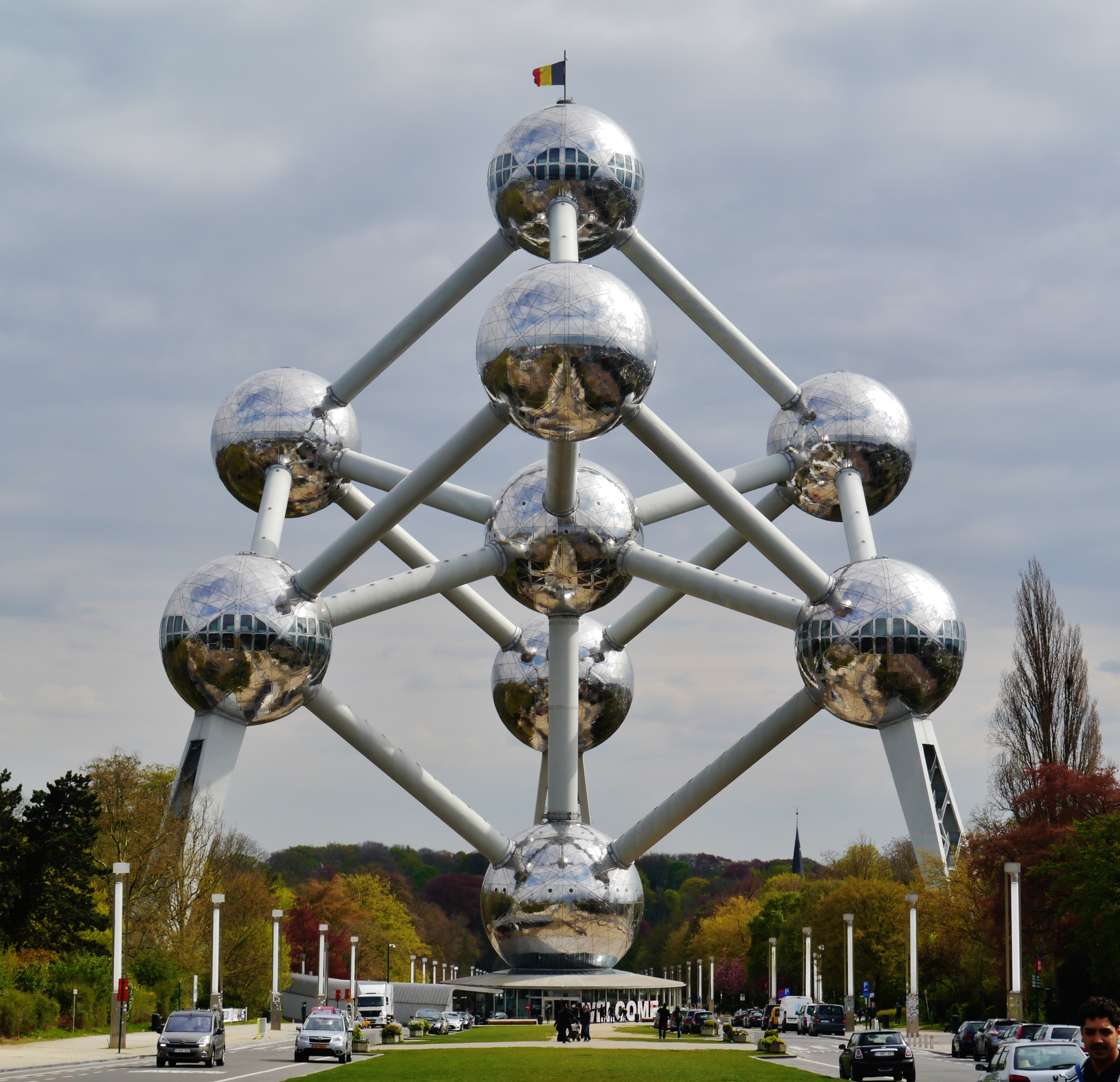
Atomium

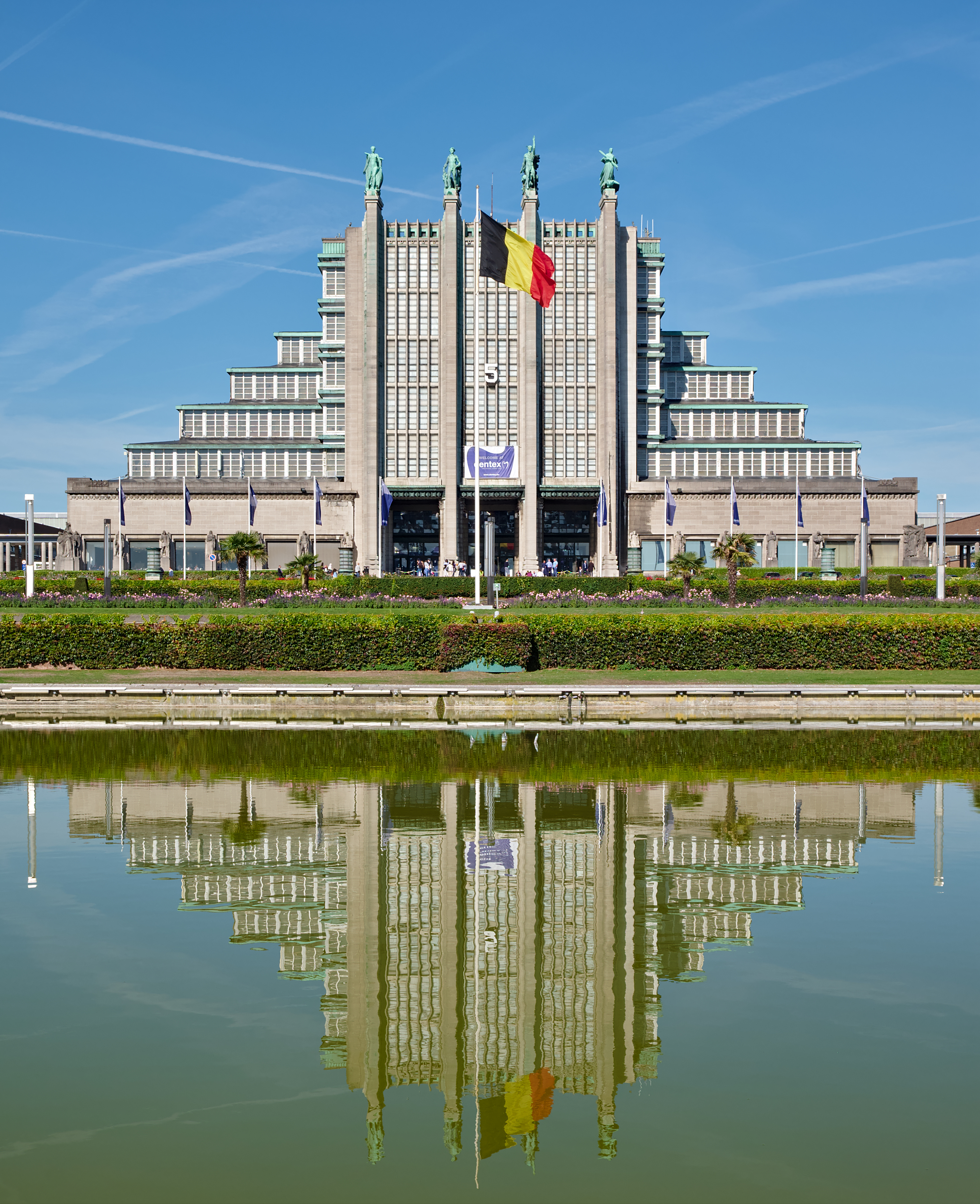
Brussels Expo

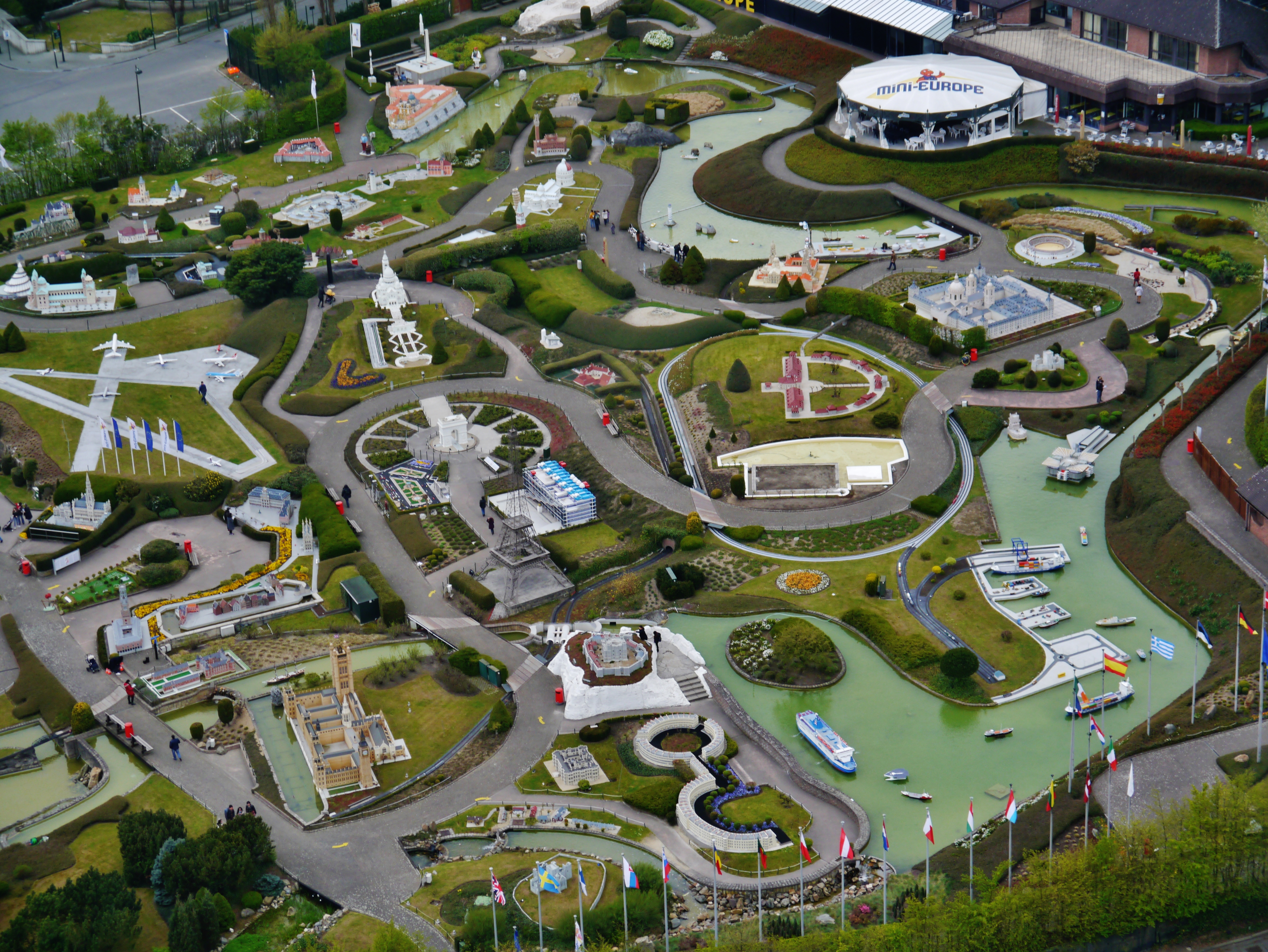
Mini-Europe

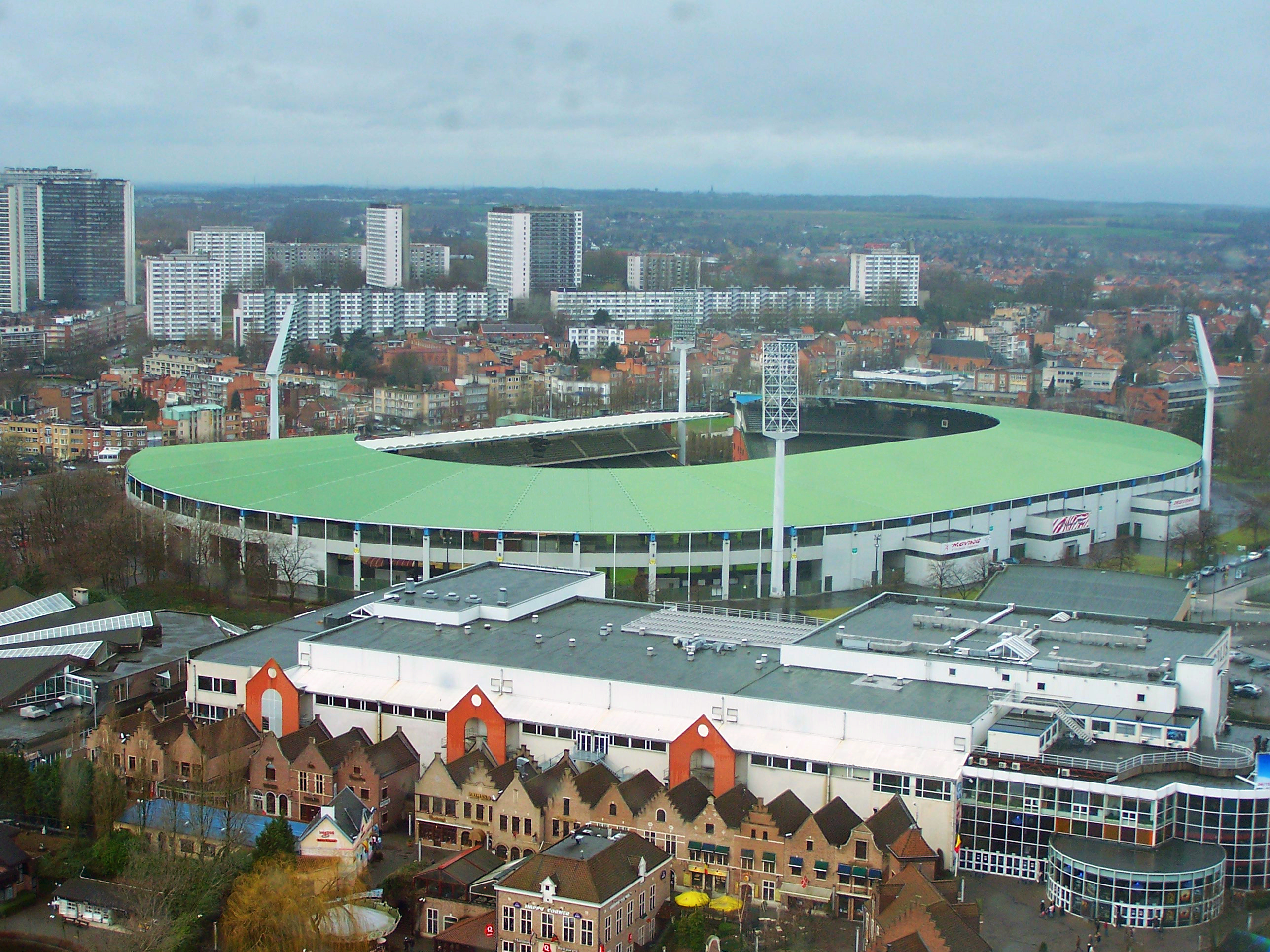
King Baudouin Stadium

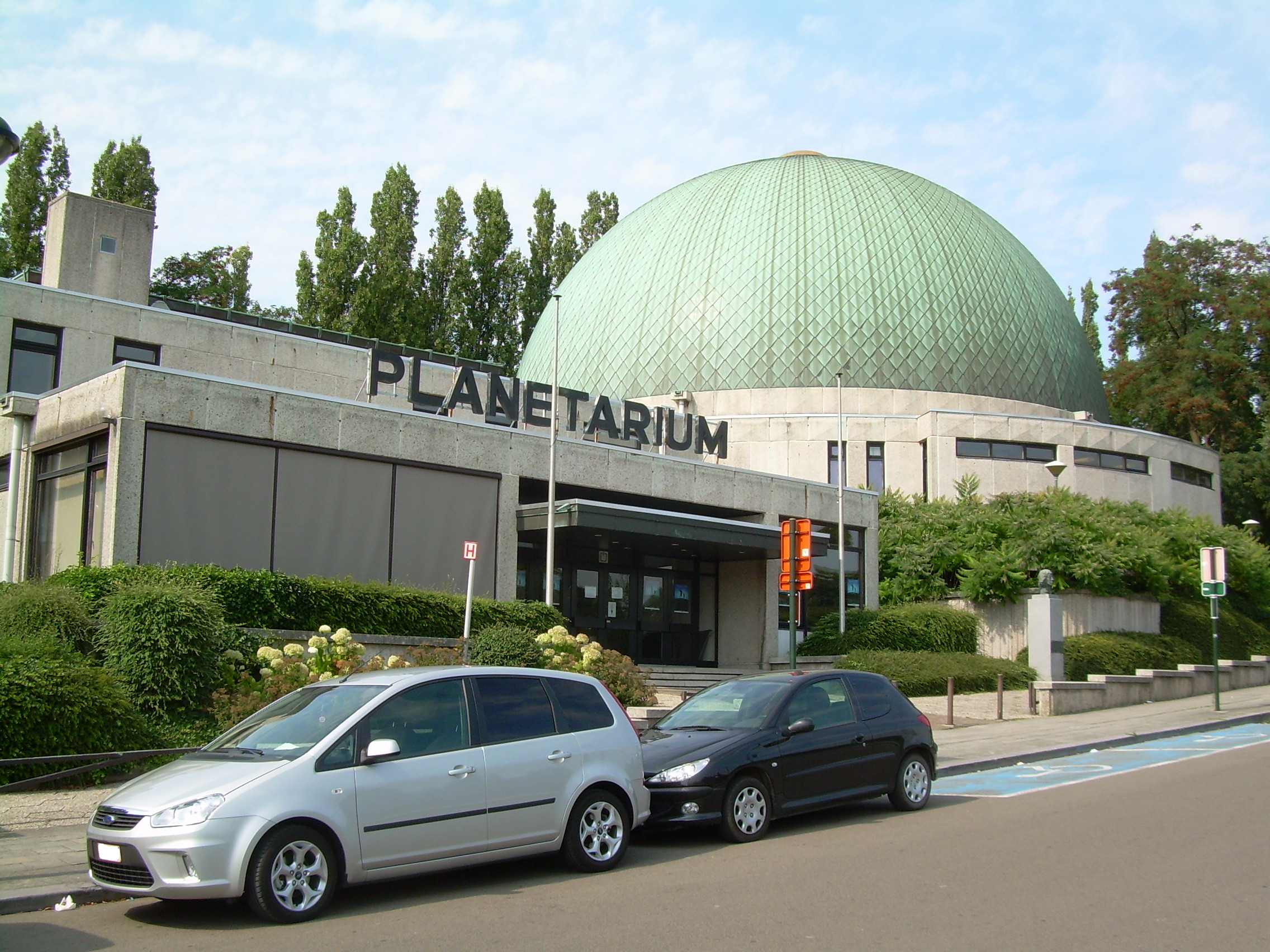
Planetarium

==== Mutsaard (De Wand) ====
Sometimes also known as the Pagoda district, the Japanese Tower district or De Wand, Mutsaard (also spelled Mutsaert) is an old hamlet and a historic neighbourhood located between Laeken and Neder-over-Heembeek and centred around the Place du Mutsaert/Mutsaertplaats or Mutsaardplein. The district was part of the former municipality of Laeken (postcode: 1020), but also a piece of Neder-over-Heembeek, annexed by Laeken in 1897. It is separated from the rest of Laeken by the Royal Domain and is the site of the Museums of the Far East. The district also extends a little into the neighbouring Flemish municipalities of Vilvoorde and Grimbergen.

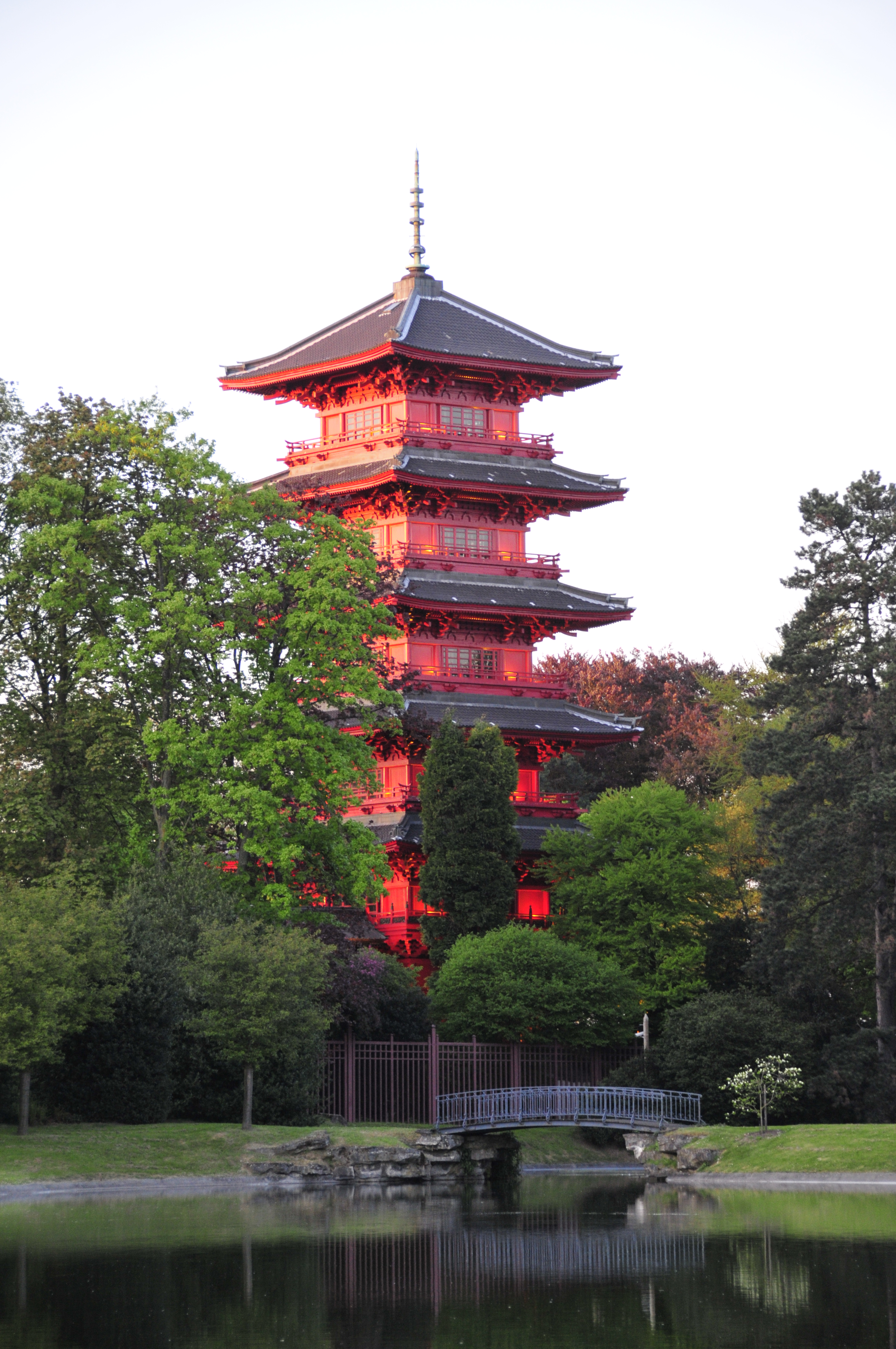
Japanese Tower

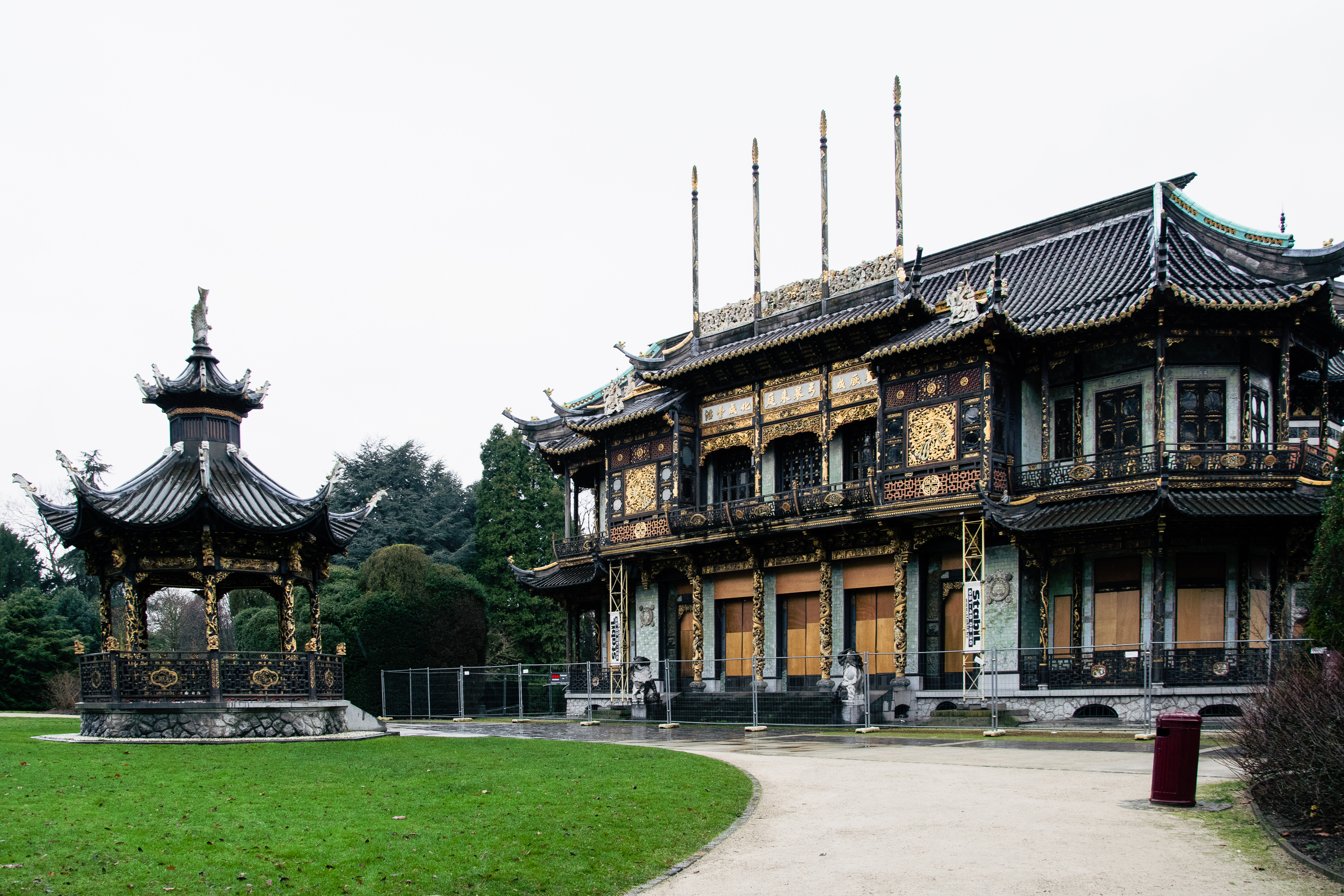
Chinese Pavilion

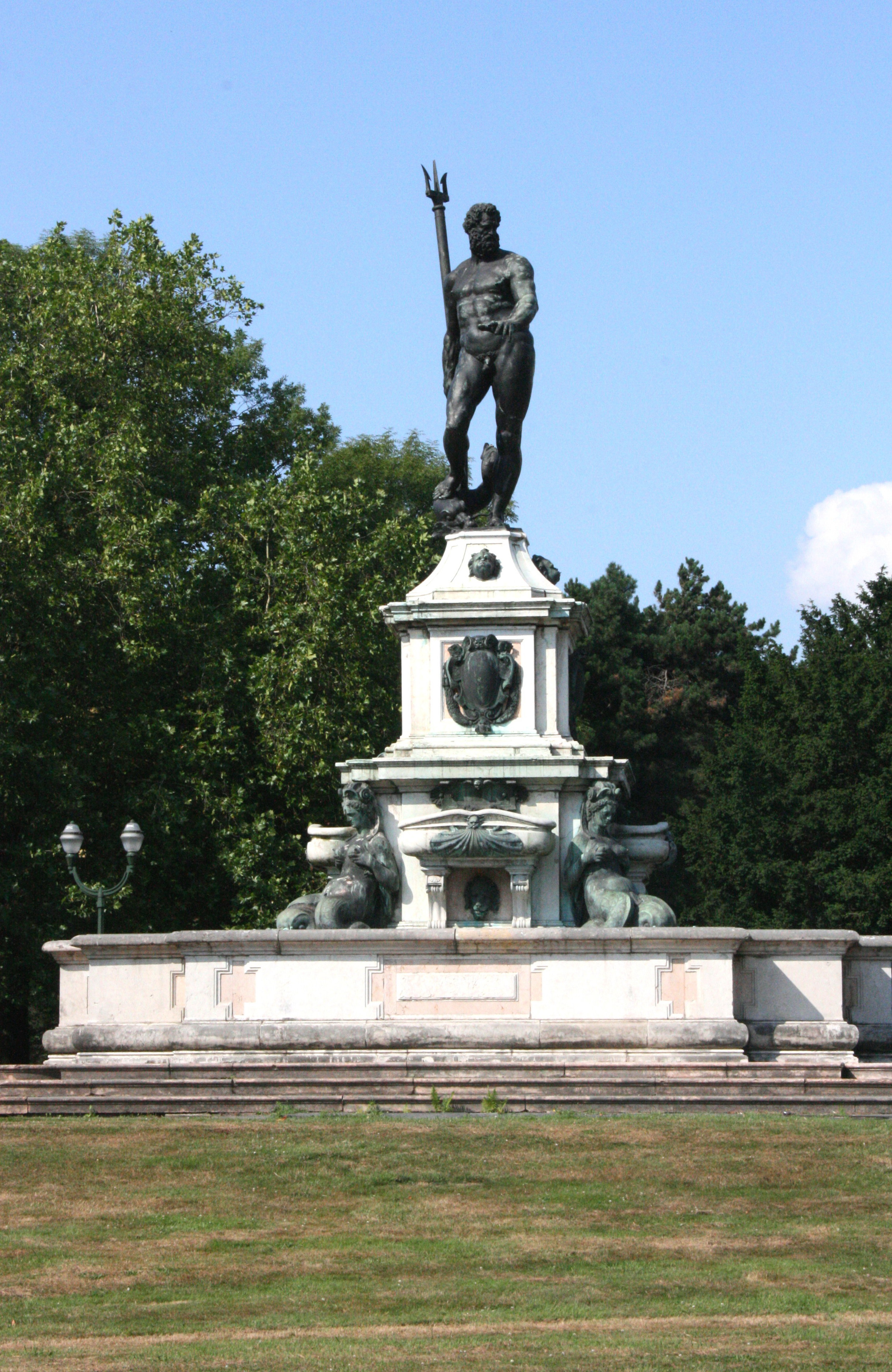
Fountain of Neptune

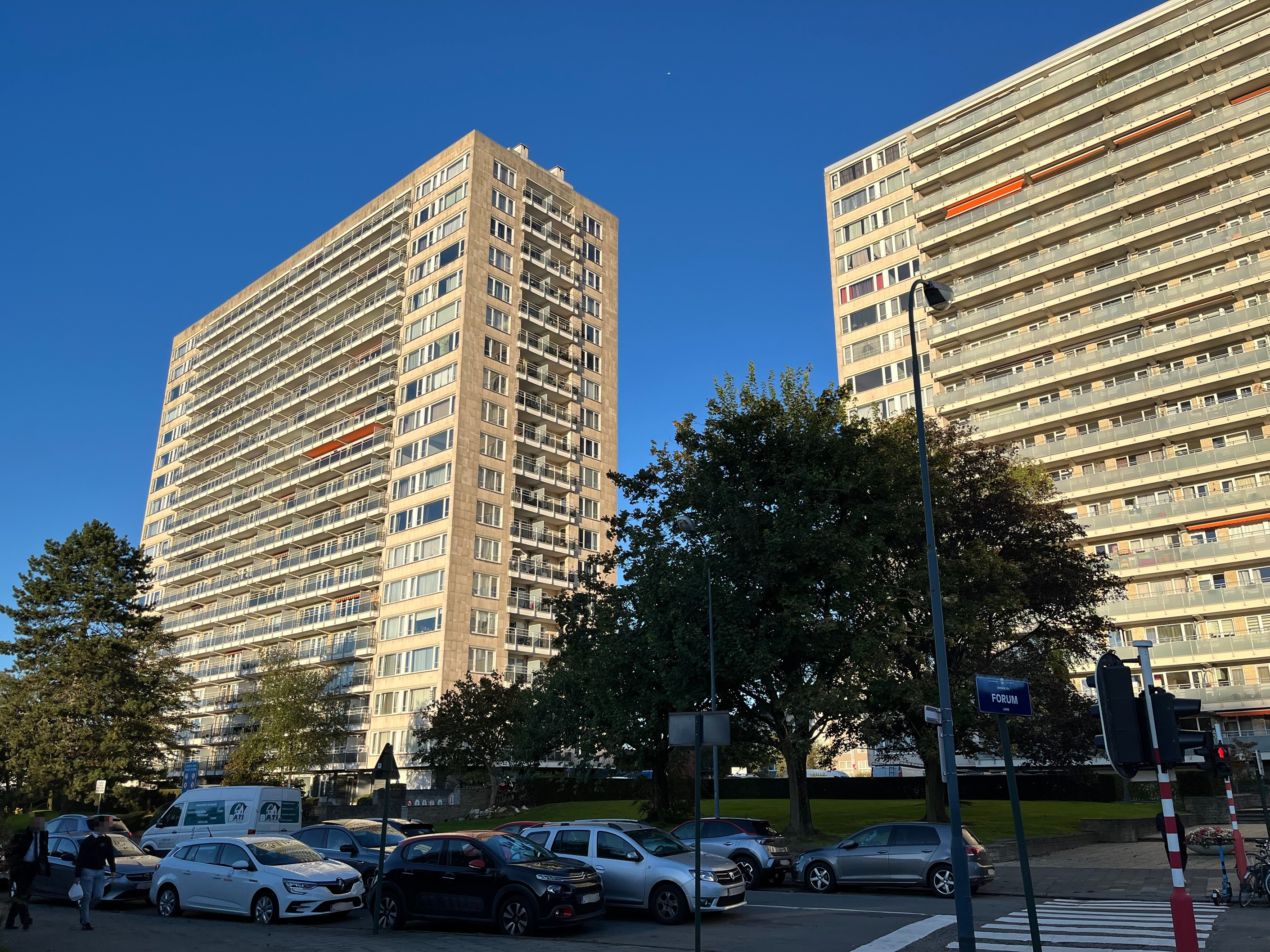
Avenue Mutsaard/Mutsaardlaan

==== Verregat ====
Verregat is located north of the Heysel, east of the Cité Modèle, and bordering the Flemish Region to the north. The area was developed in phases between 1922 and 1926 by the architects Henri Derée and Jules Ghobert, in a style influenced by the Amsterdam School and with picturesque character, and then from 1951 to 1953 by the same Ghobert.

==== Neder-Over-Heembeek ====
Neder-Over-Heembeek is a former municipality incorporated into the City of Brussels in 1921, at the same time as Laeken and Haren. It has the distinction of having the oldest place name in the Brussels-Capital Region, as it was mentioned in an ordinance as early as the 7th century. Nowadays, it is a predominantly industrial zone, especially known for the Queen Astrid Military Hospital, which is the National Burns and Poisons Centre, as well as recruitment services of the Belgian Armed Forces.

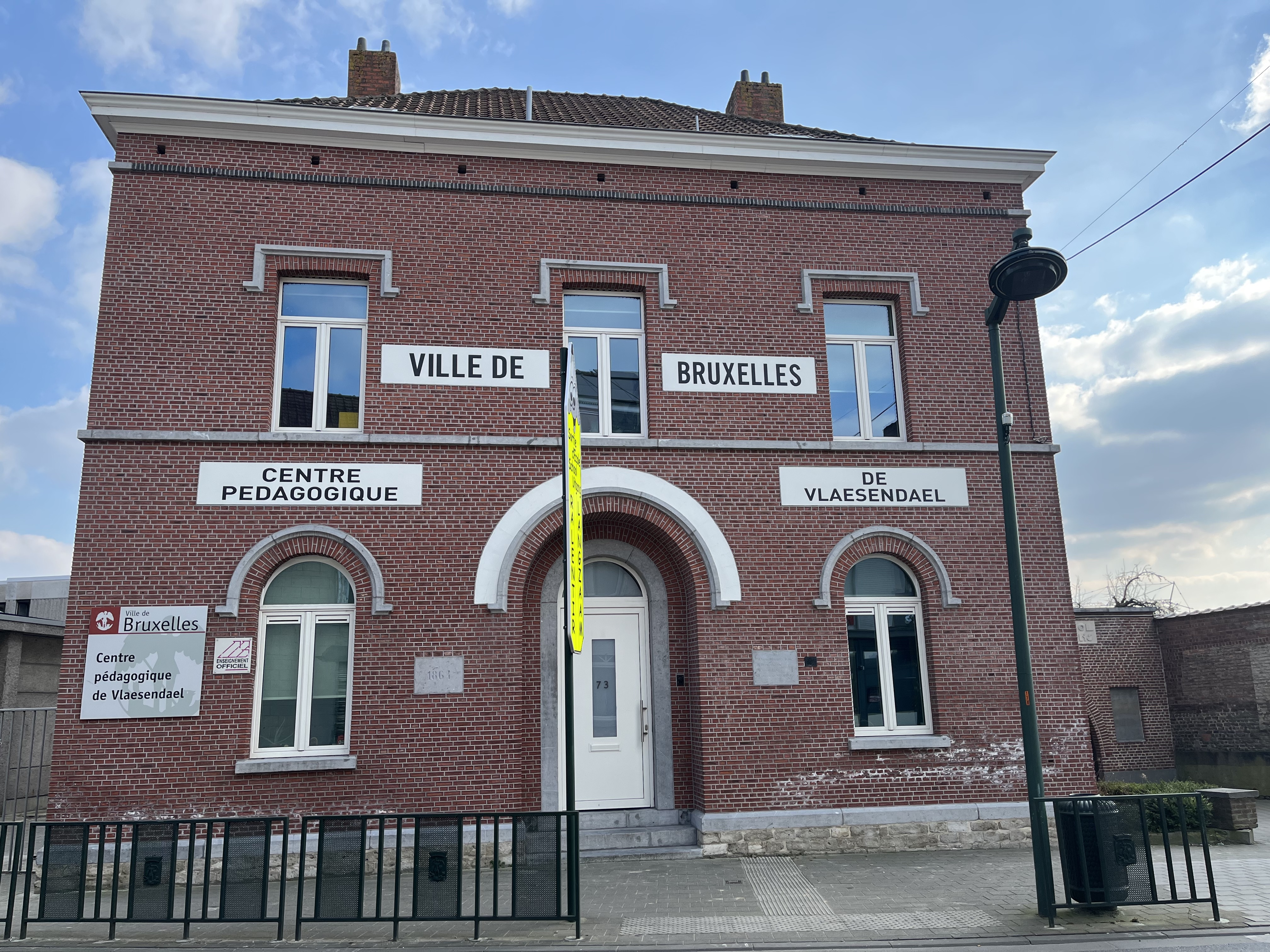
Former Municipal Hall of Neder-Over-Heembeek

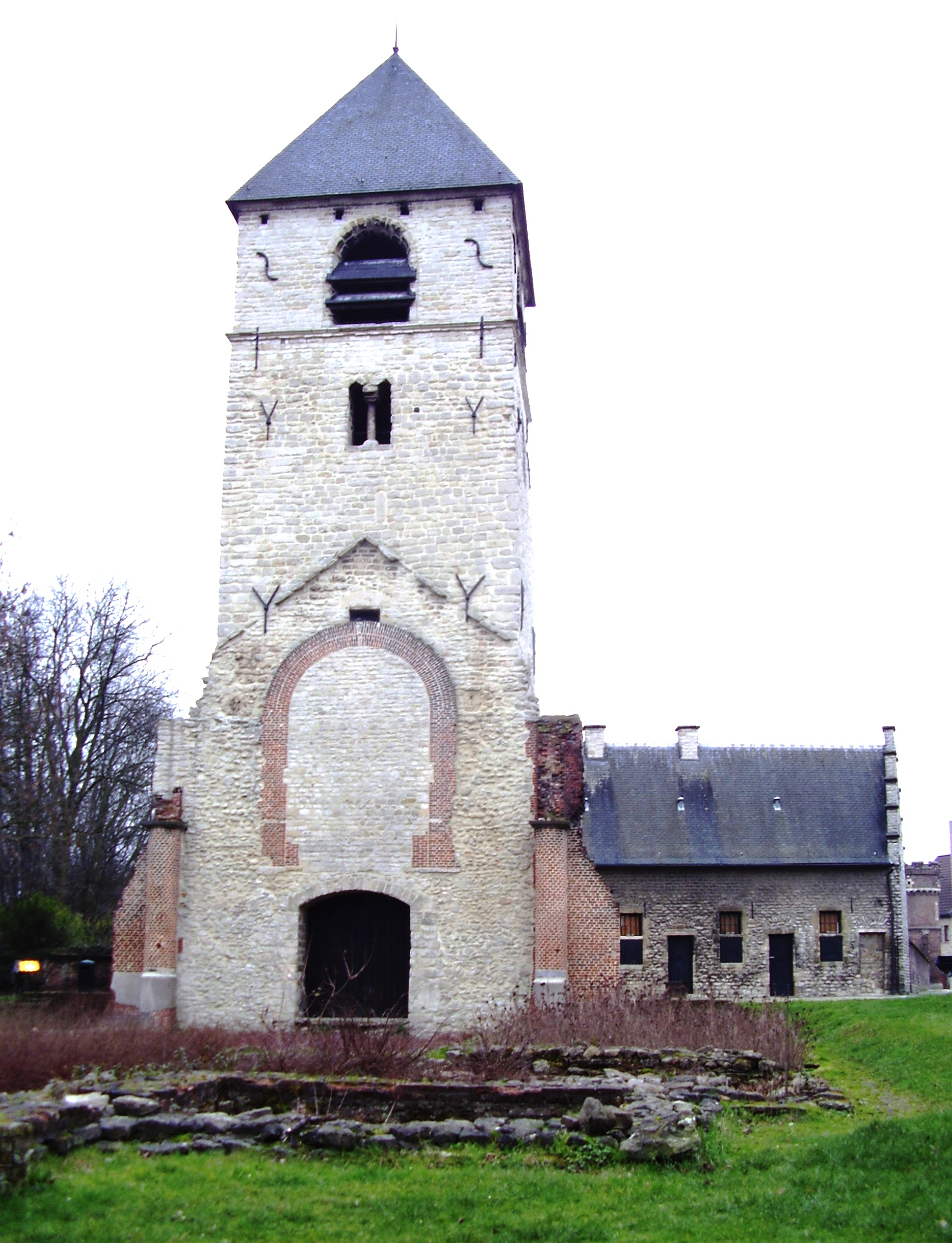
Old Romanesque tower in Lower Heembeek

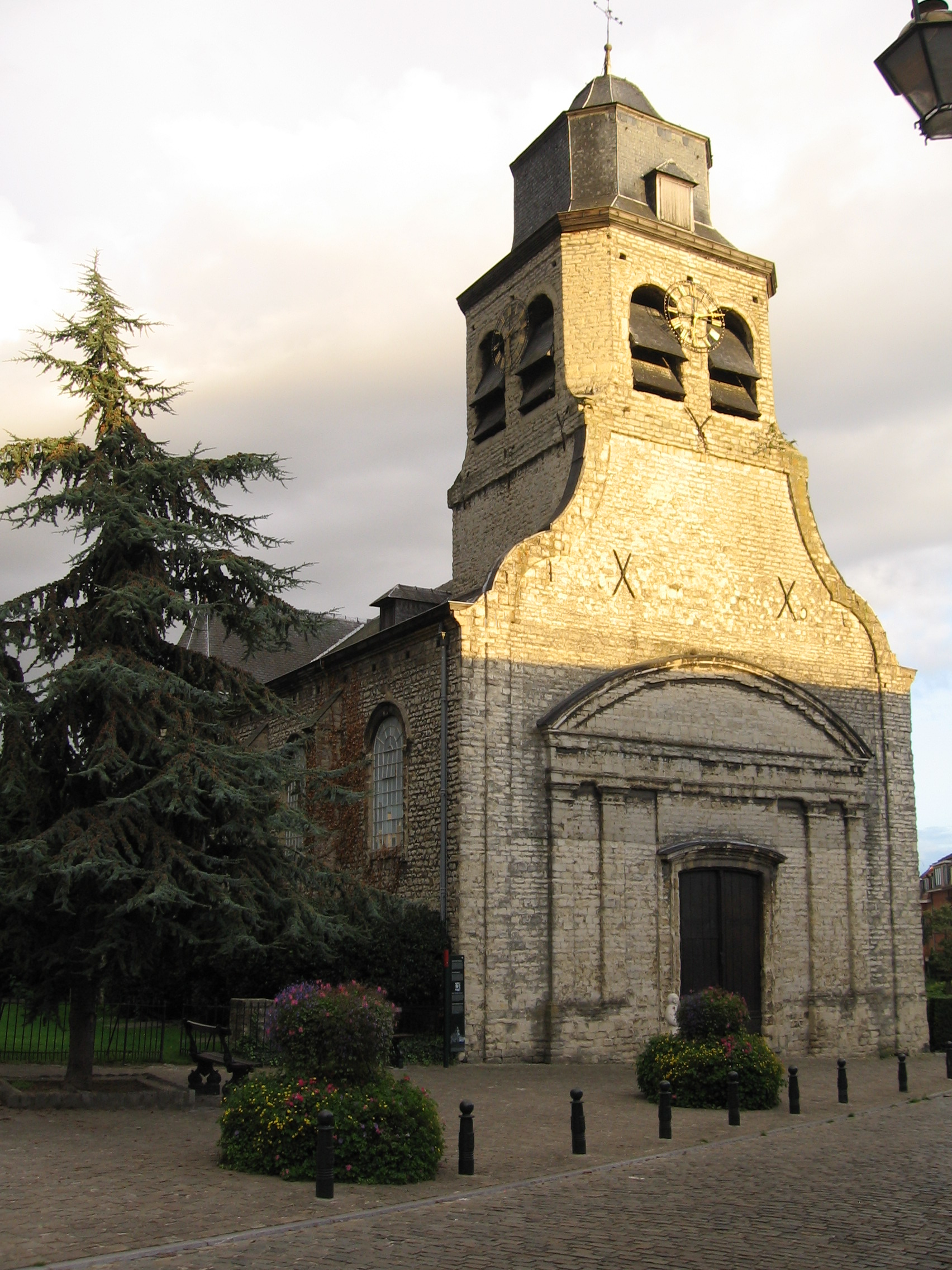
Church of St. Nicholas in Upper Heembeek

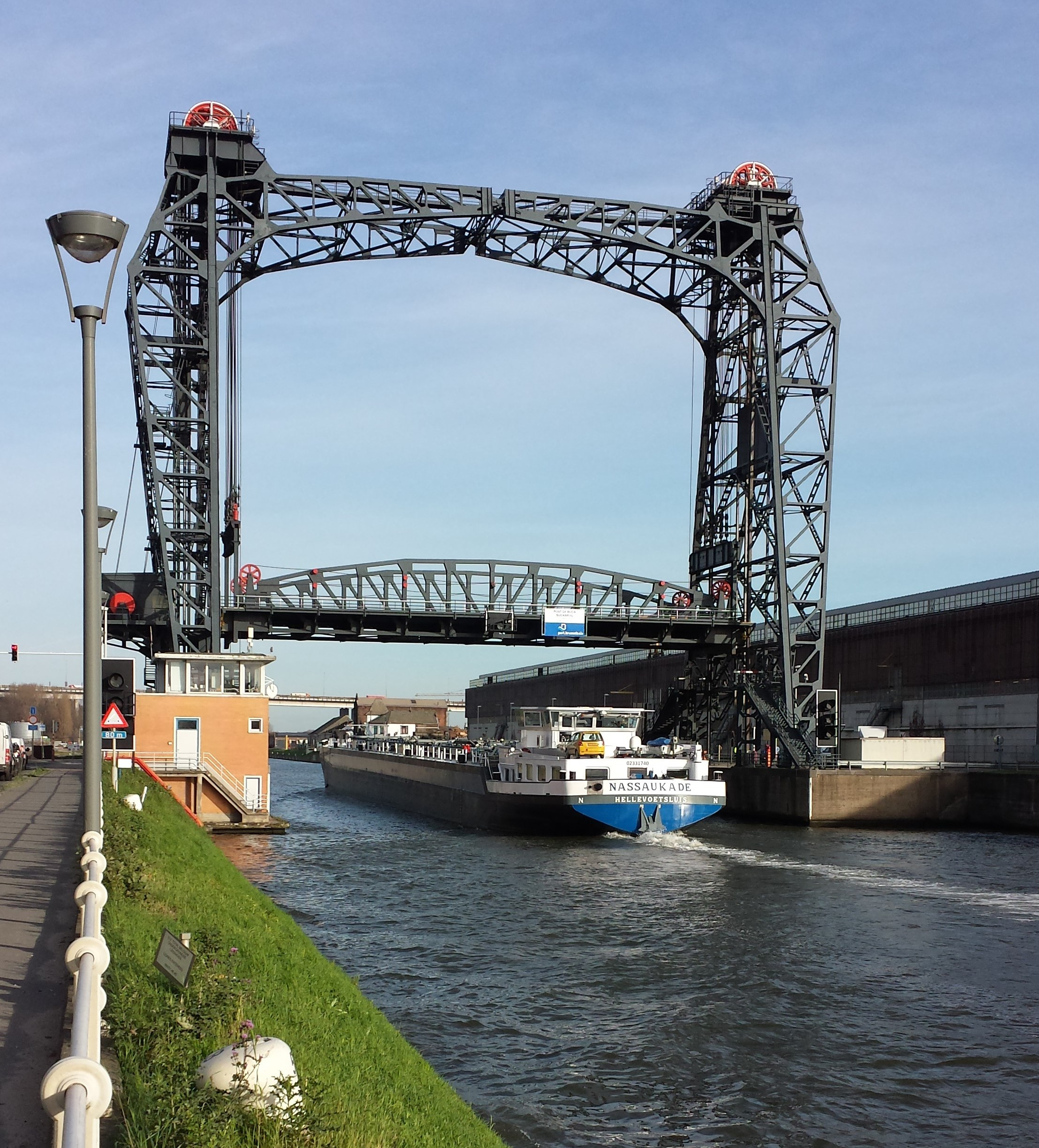
Buda Bridge

==== Haren ====
Like Laeken and Neder-Over-Heembeek, the former municipality of Haren was annexed by the municipality (City) of Brussels in 1921, which allowed the extension of Schaerbeek railway station north of its territory. But it was above all the presence, south-west of the town, of an airfield, created by the Germans during the First World War, and where the former Belgian national airline Sabena was born, that precipitated the annexation of Haren. Since 1967, Haren has been home to NATO's headquarters. It is also the location of many other administrations and companies, such as the headquarters of Eurocontrol.

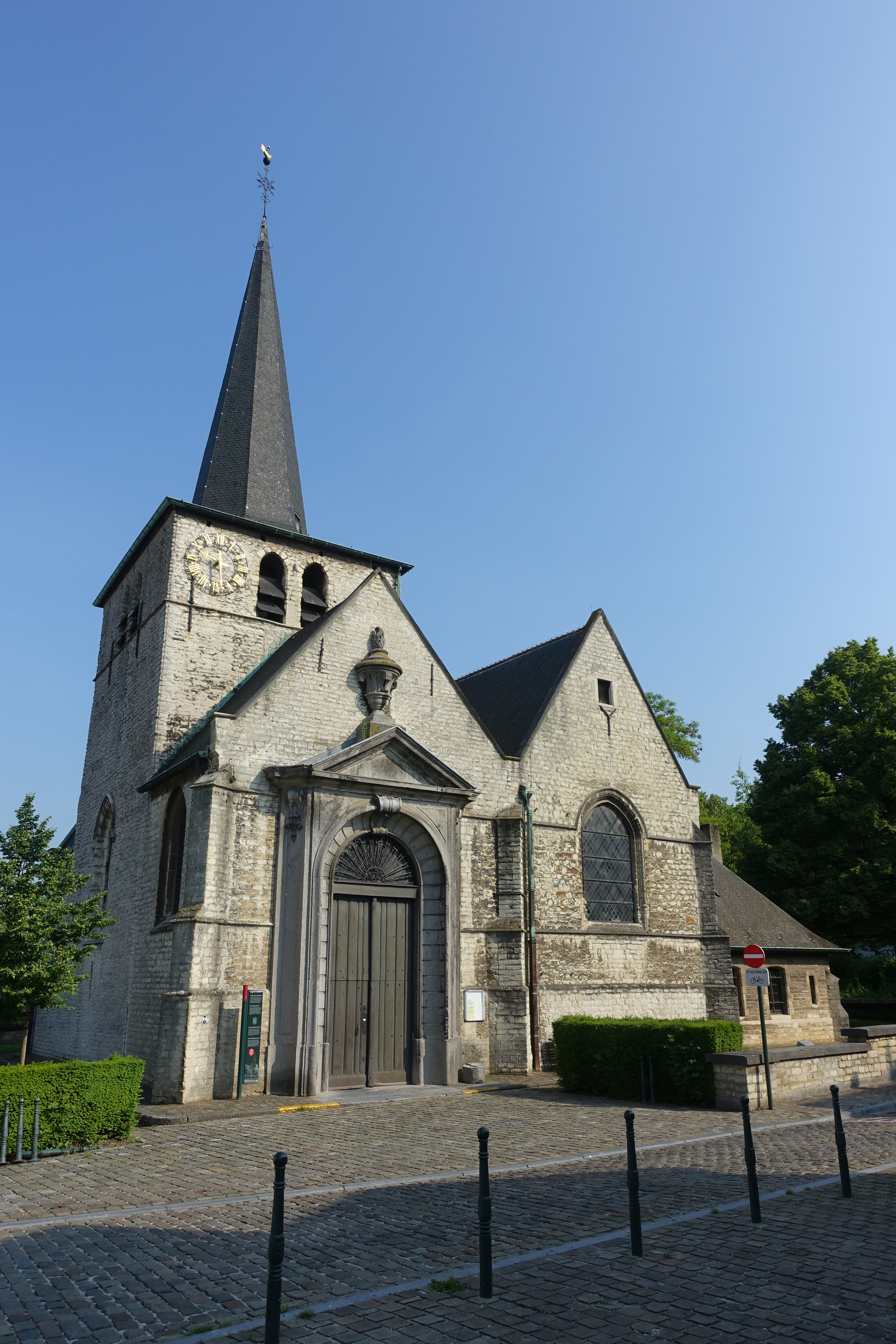
Church of St. Elizabeth

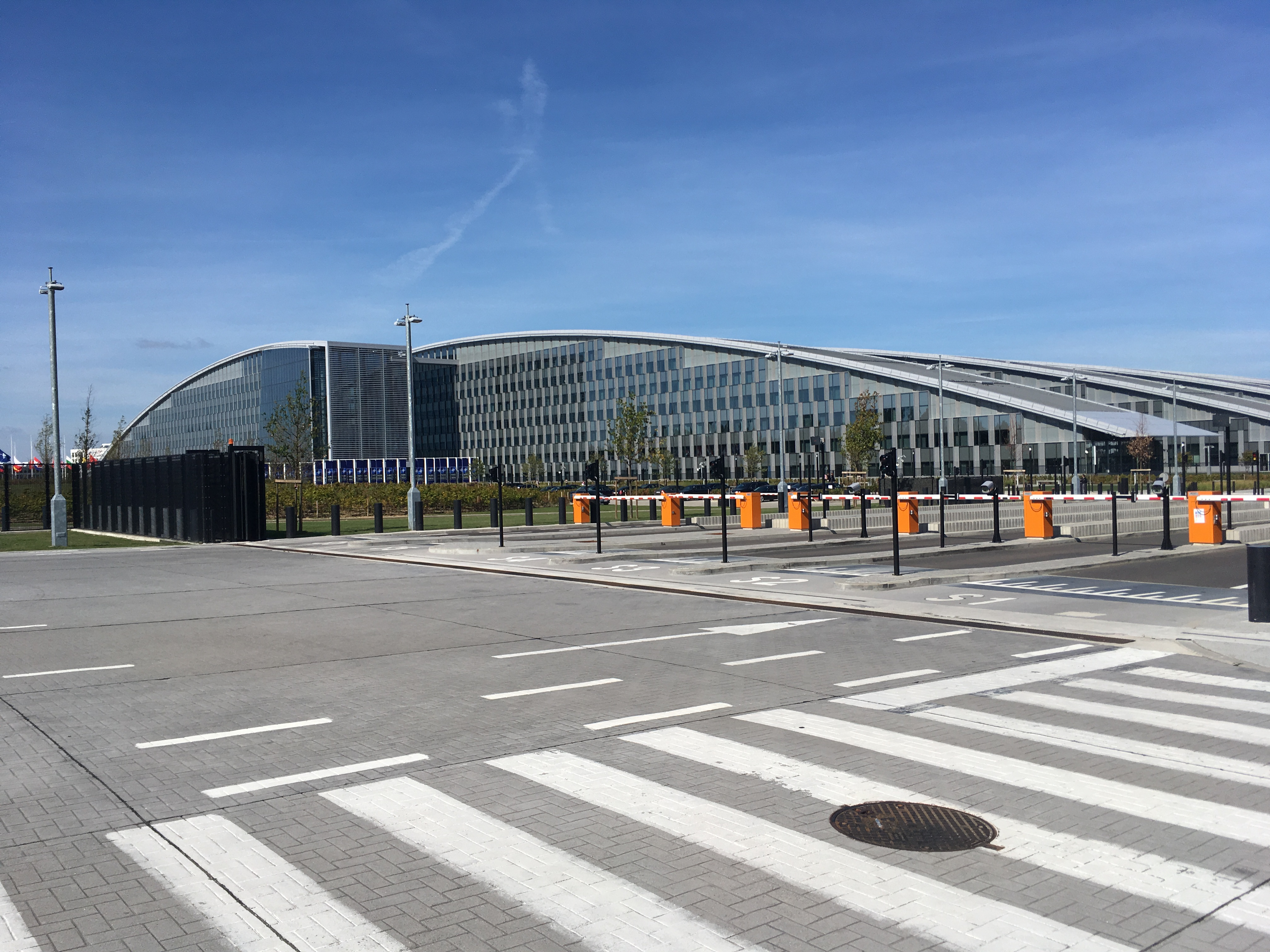
Headquarters of NATO

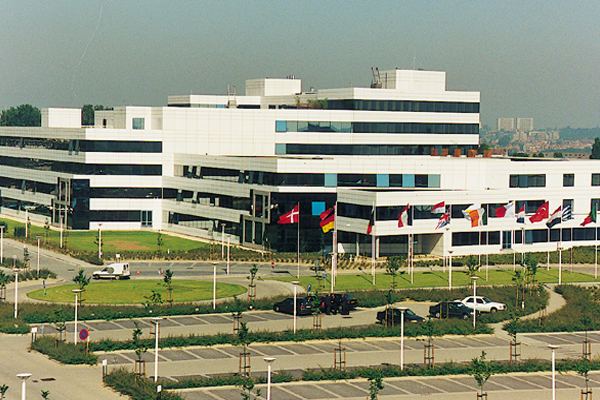
Headquarters of Eurocontrol

==== Northern Quarter ====
The Northern Quarter (French: Quartier Nord, Dutch: Noordwijk) is Brussels' central business district and consists of a concentration of high-rise buildings where many Belgian and multinational companies have their headquarters. It is comparable to La Défense in Paris or the Docklands in London. Located between the Brussels Canal, Brussels-North railway station, and the Small Ring, the area spans Saint-Josse-ten-Noode, Schaerbeek, and the City of Brussels. It contains over half of Belgium's tallest buildings, 1,200,000 m^{2} (13,000,000 sq ft) of office space, 40,000 workers, and 8,000 residents.

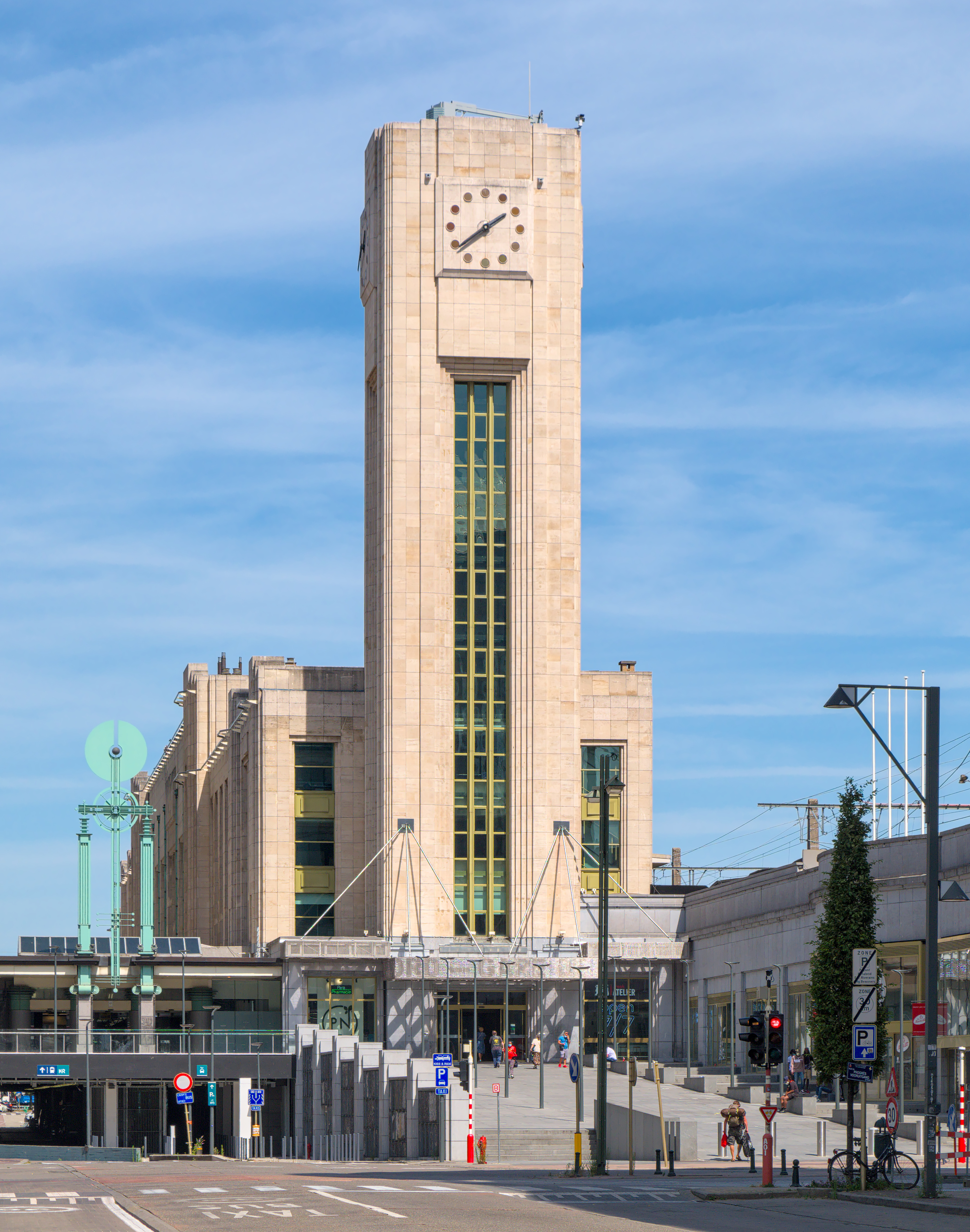
Brussels-North railway station

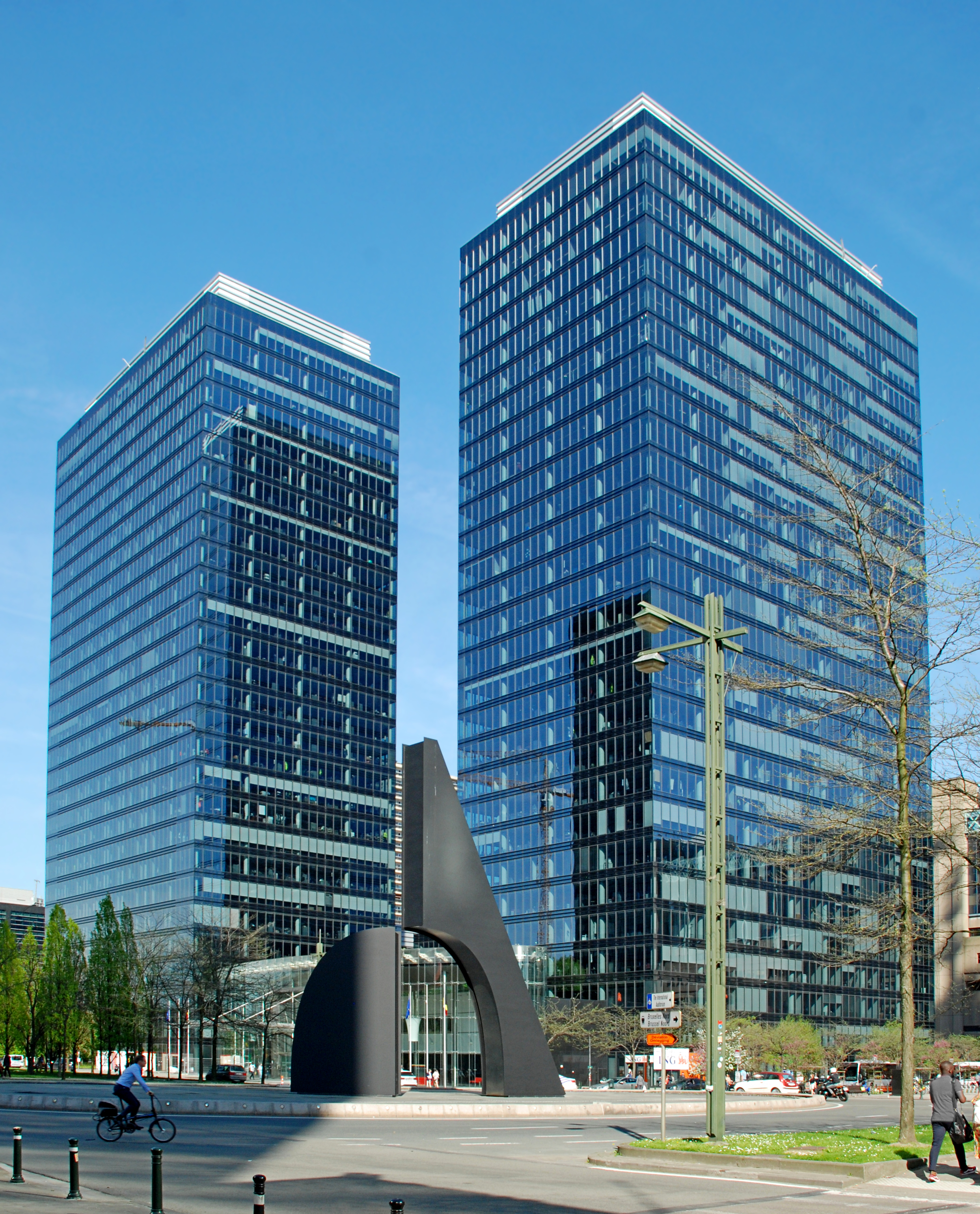
North Galaxy Towers

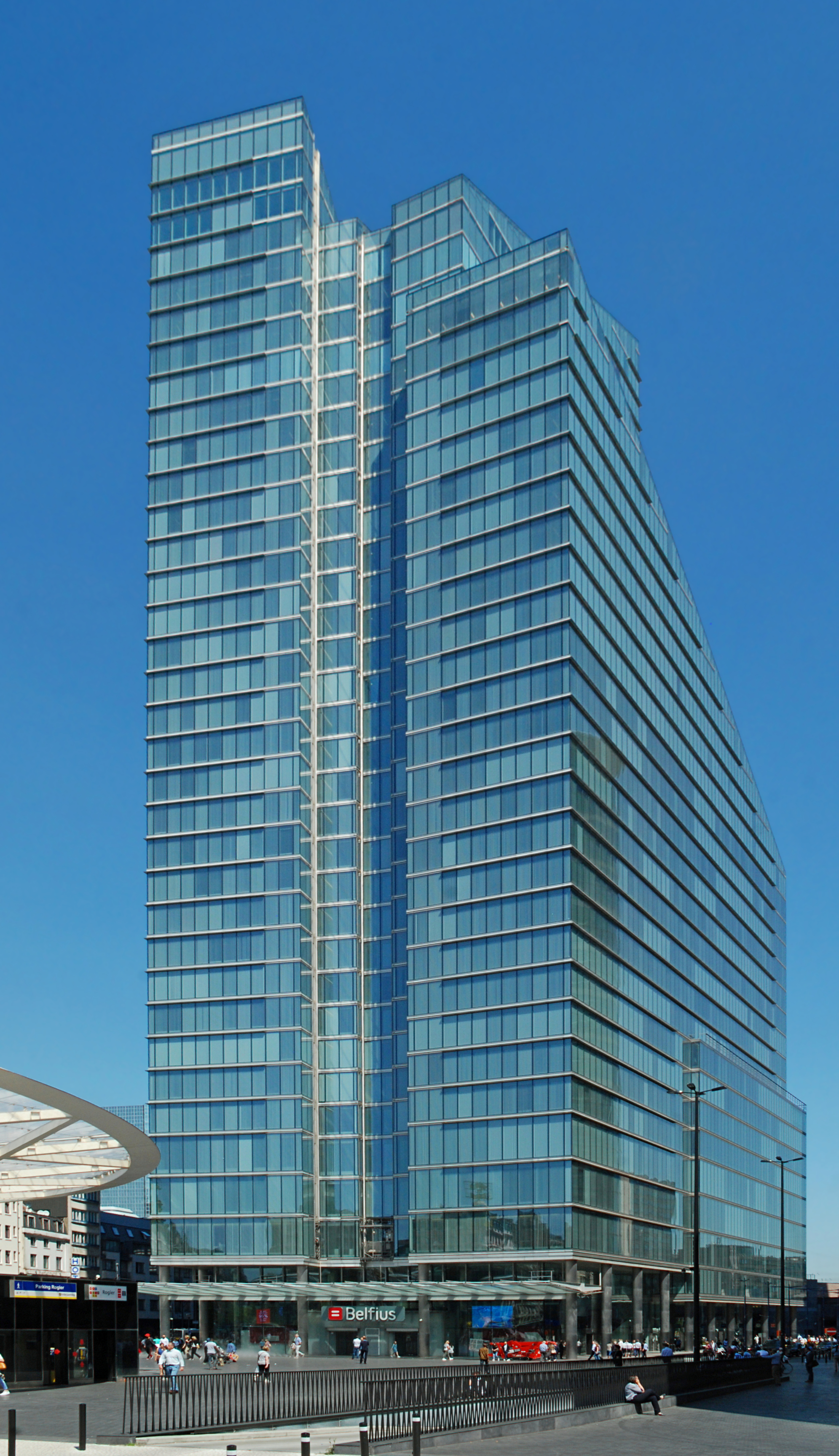
Rogier Tower

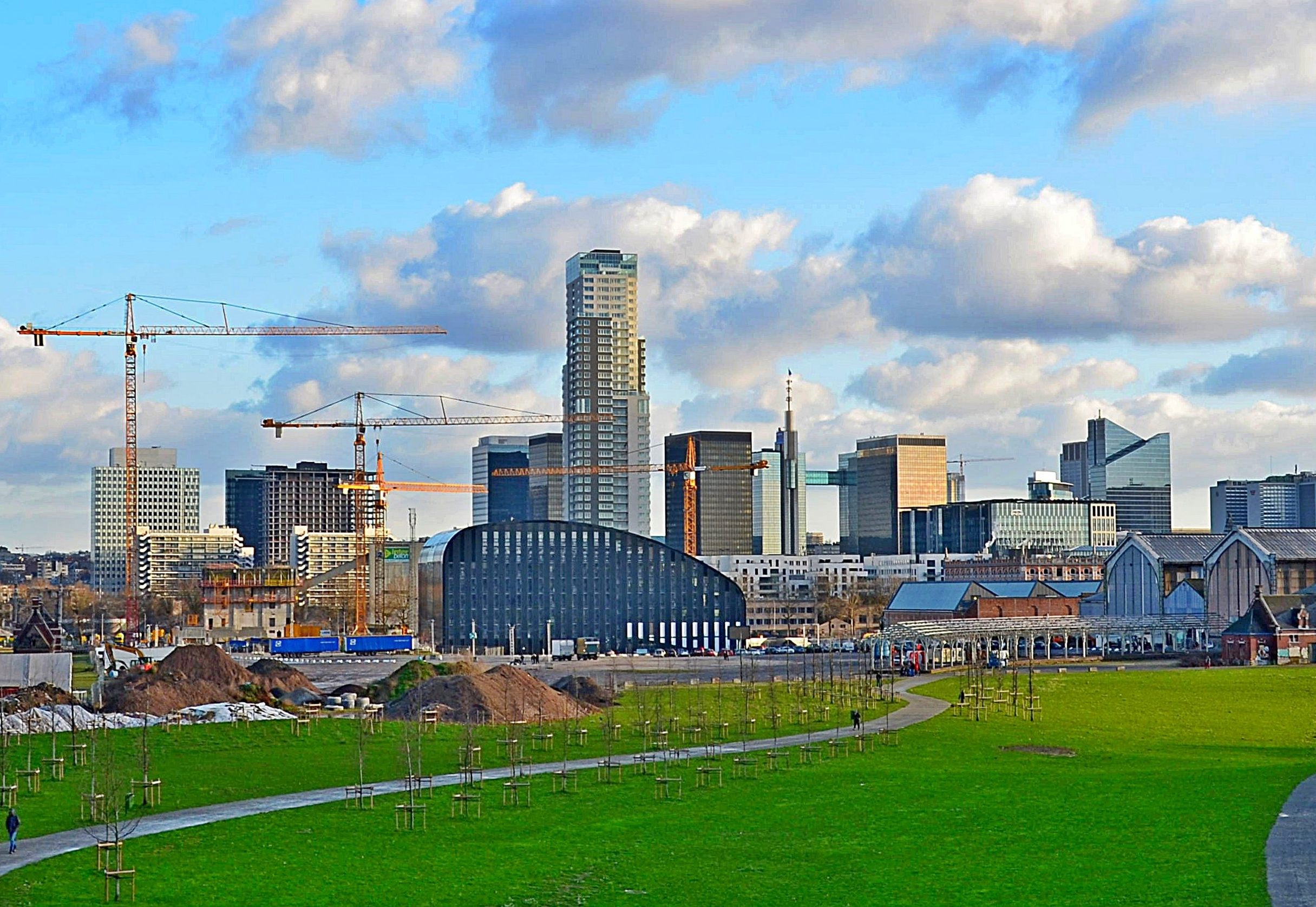
Skyline of the Northern Quarter

==== Tour & Taxis ====
Tour & Taxis is a large former industrial site situated on the embankment of the Brussels Canal, just north-west of the Pentagon, which was annexed by the City of Brussels in 1897. The location is immediately adjacent to Laeken and Molenbeek-Saint-Jean, and about 1 km (0.62 mi) west from the Northern Quarter. The site is composed of large warehouses and commercial buildings at a former freight train station called the Maritime Station (French: Gare Maritime, Dutch: Maritiem Station), and its spacious central hall known as the Royal Depot (French: Entrepôt Royal, Dutch: Koninklijk Pakhuis). The main buildings on the site are made of brick, glass and wrought iron, and are examples of 19th-century industrial architecture. Though the site was long disused following its loss of importance as a transshipment and customs hub, it has been partially regenerated, and is now used for shops, offices, eateries, as well as for large cultural events.

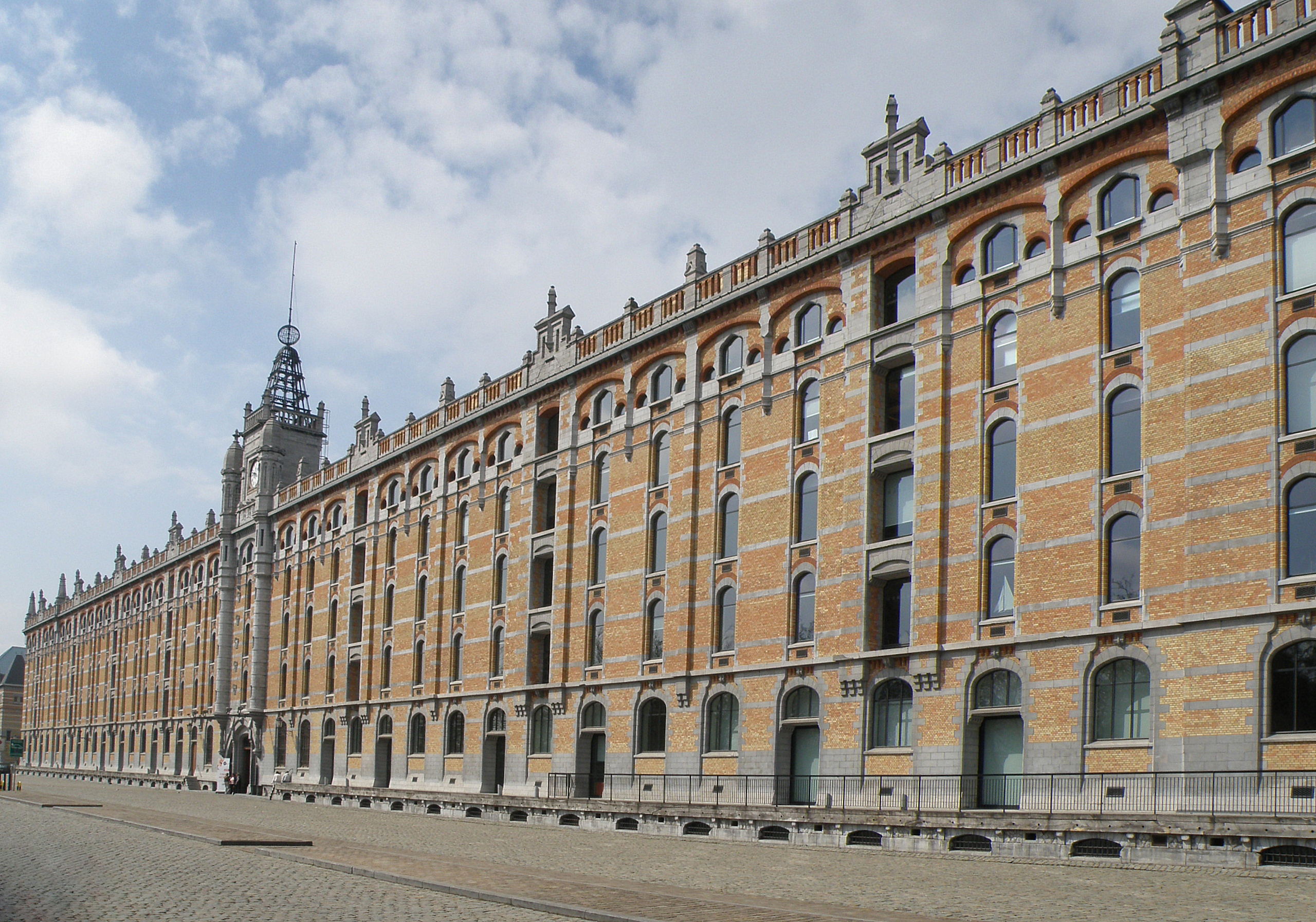
Royal Depot of Tour & Taxis

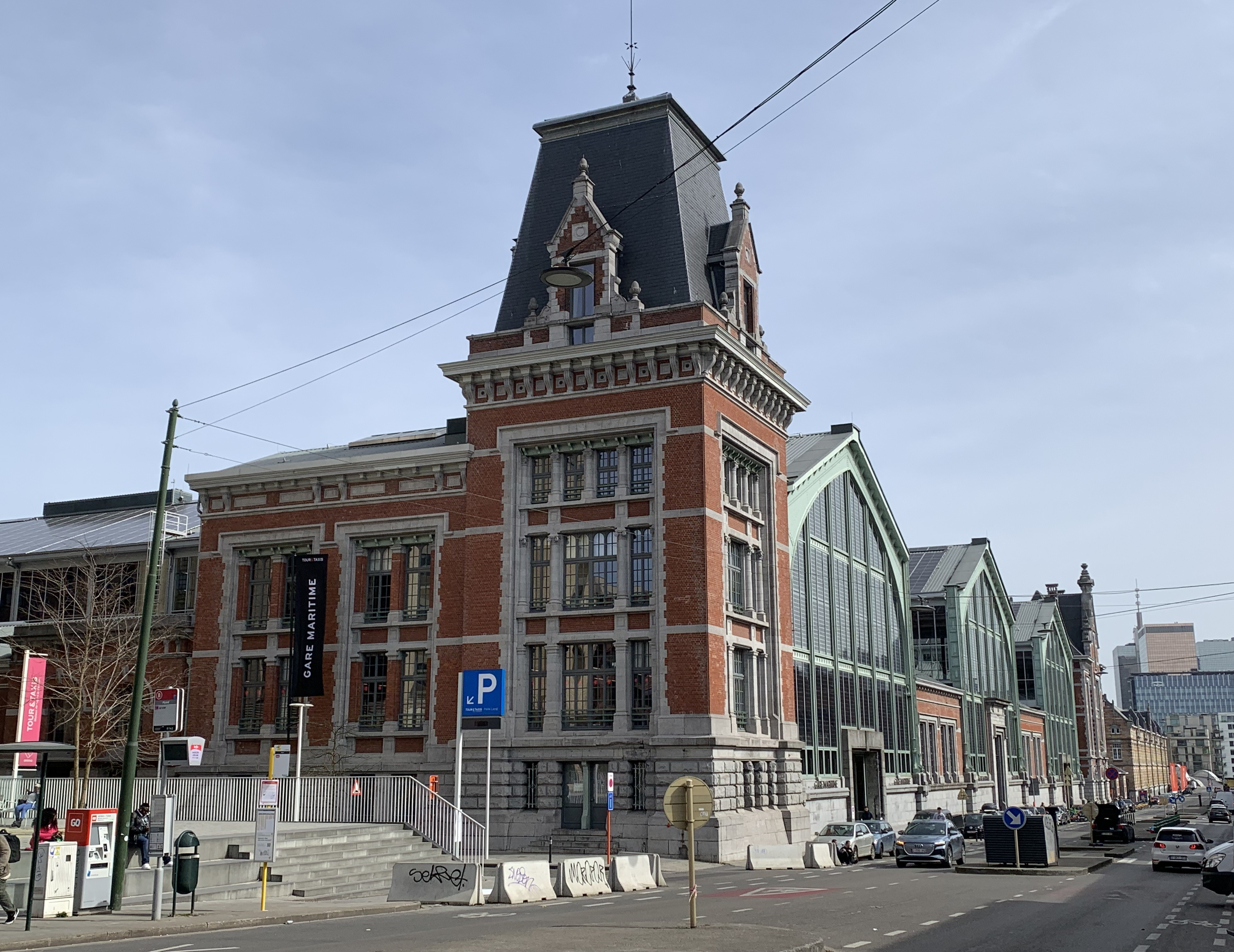
Maritime Station of Tour & Taxis

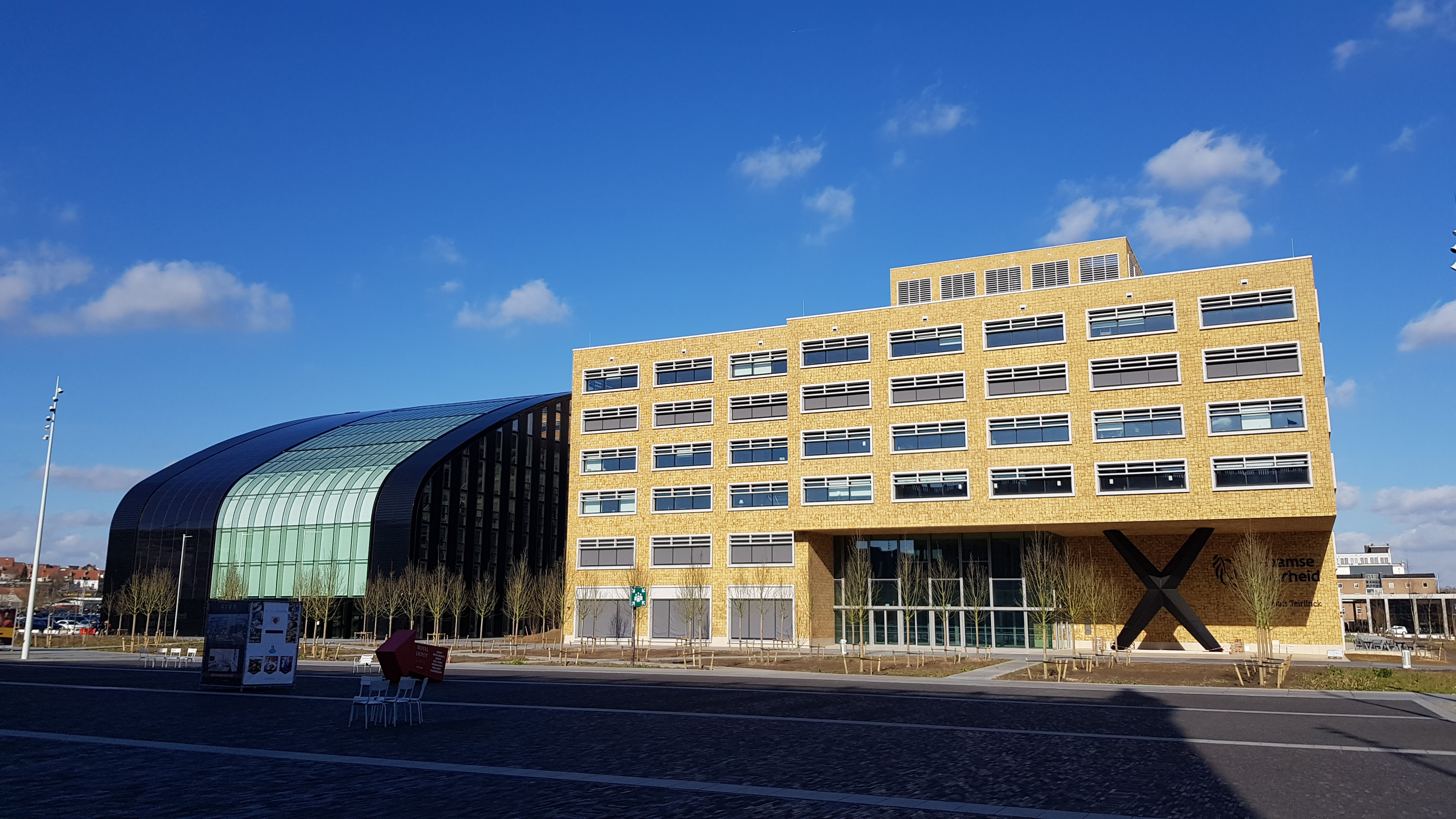
Brussels Environment building (left) and Herman Teirlinck building (right)

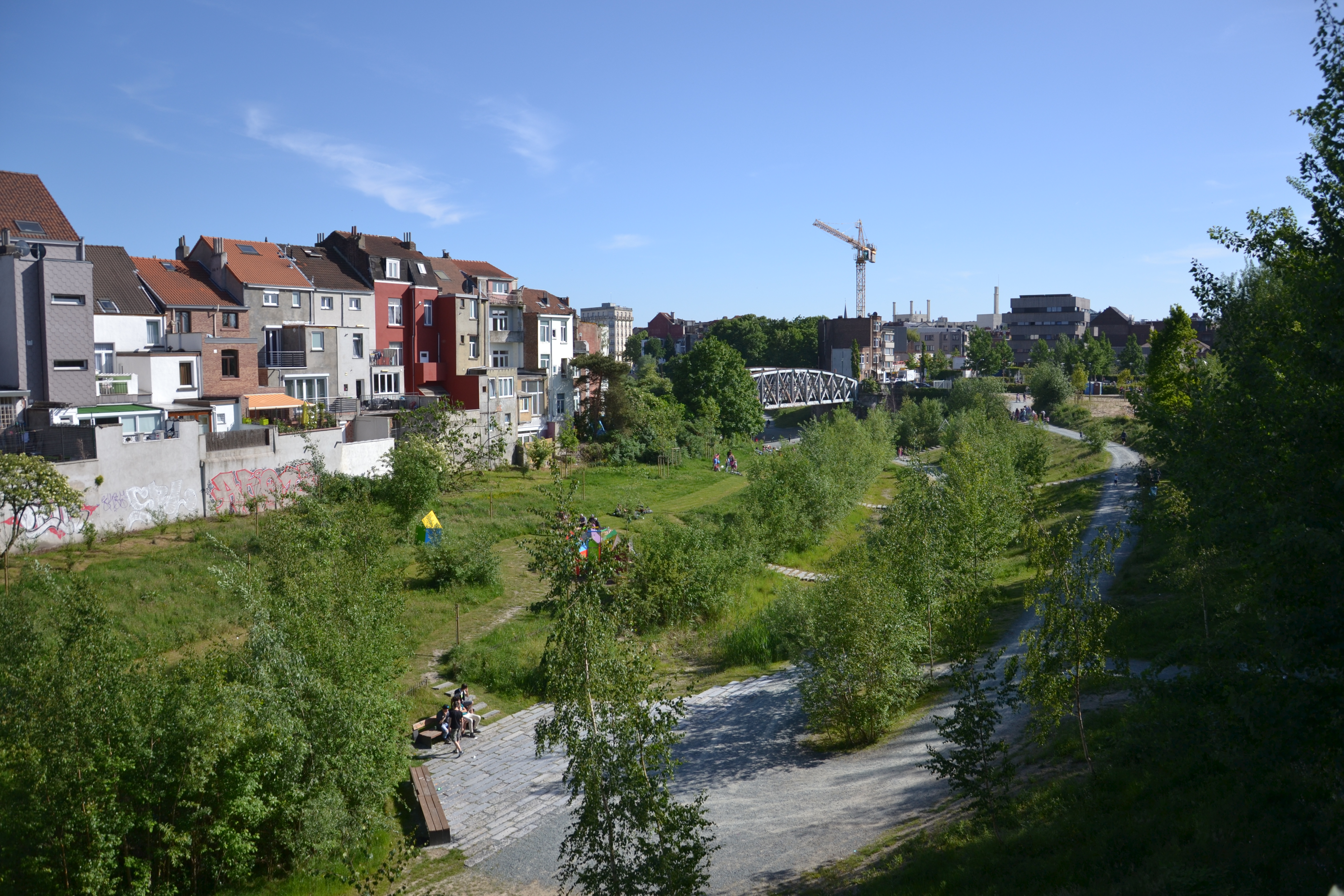
Tour & Taxis Park

=== Southern Quarters ===
==== Louise/Louiza ====
The Louise/Louiza district comprises the Avenue Louise/Louizalaan and its immediate surroundings. This avenue lies on the territory of the City of Brussels, except for the part called the "Louise bottleneck" (French: le goulet Louise), which is partially in the municipalities of Saint-Gilles and Ixelles, the territory of Brussels being limited to the roadway at this point. It is one of the most prestigious and expensive avenues in Brussels, lined with high-end fashion stores and boutiques. It also houses many embassies and offices.

Avenue Louise/Louizalaan

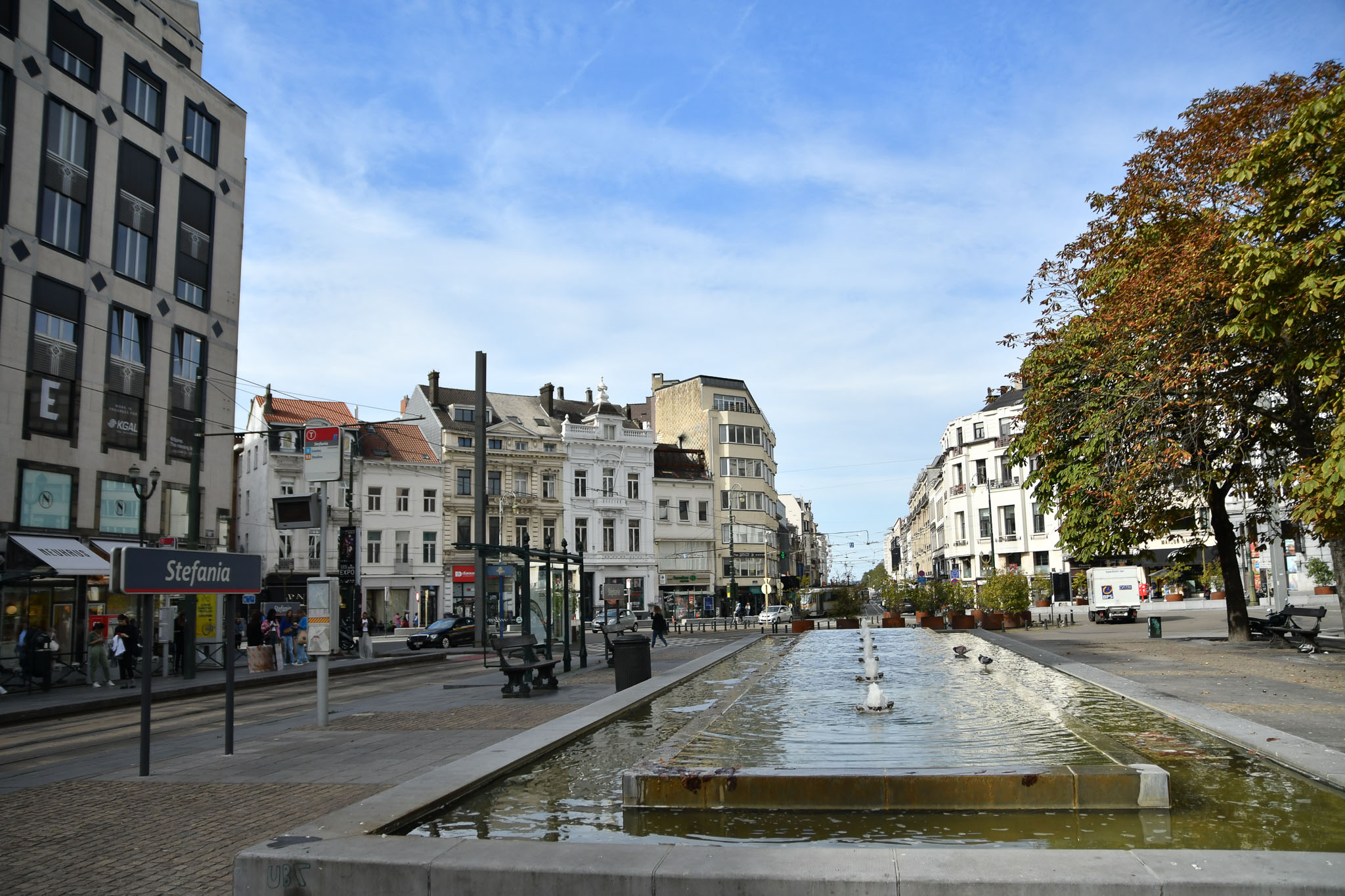
Place Stéphanie/Stefanieplein

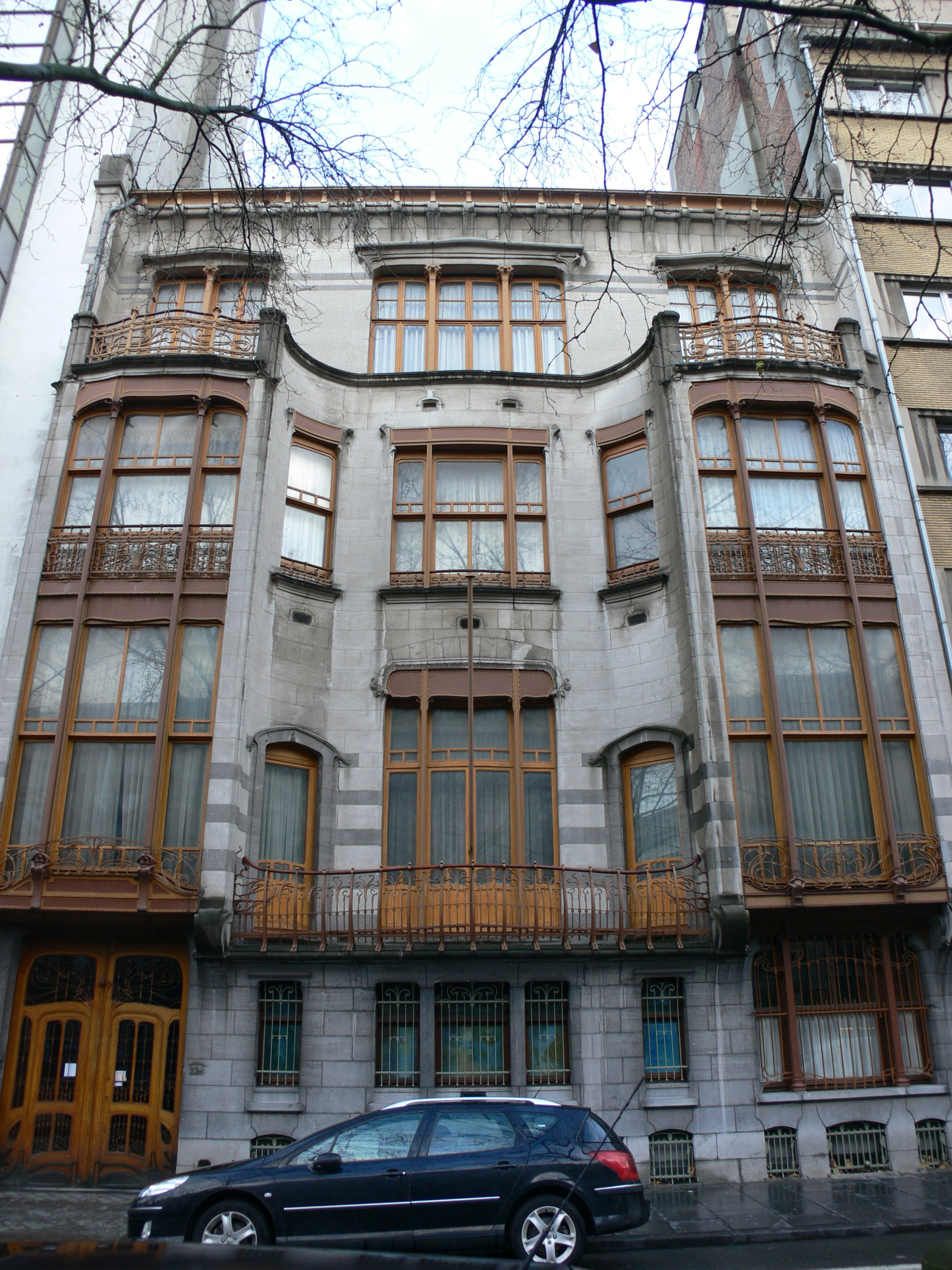
Hôtel Solvay

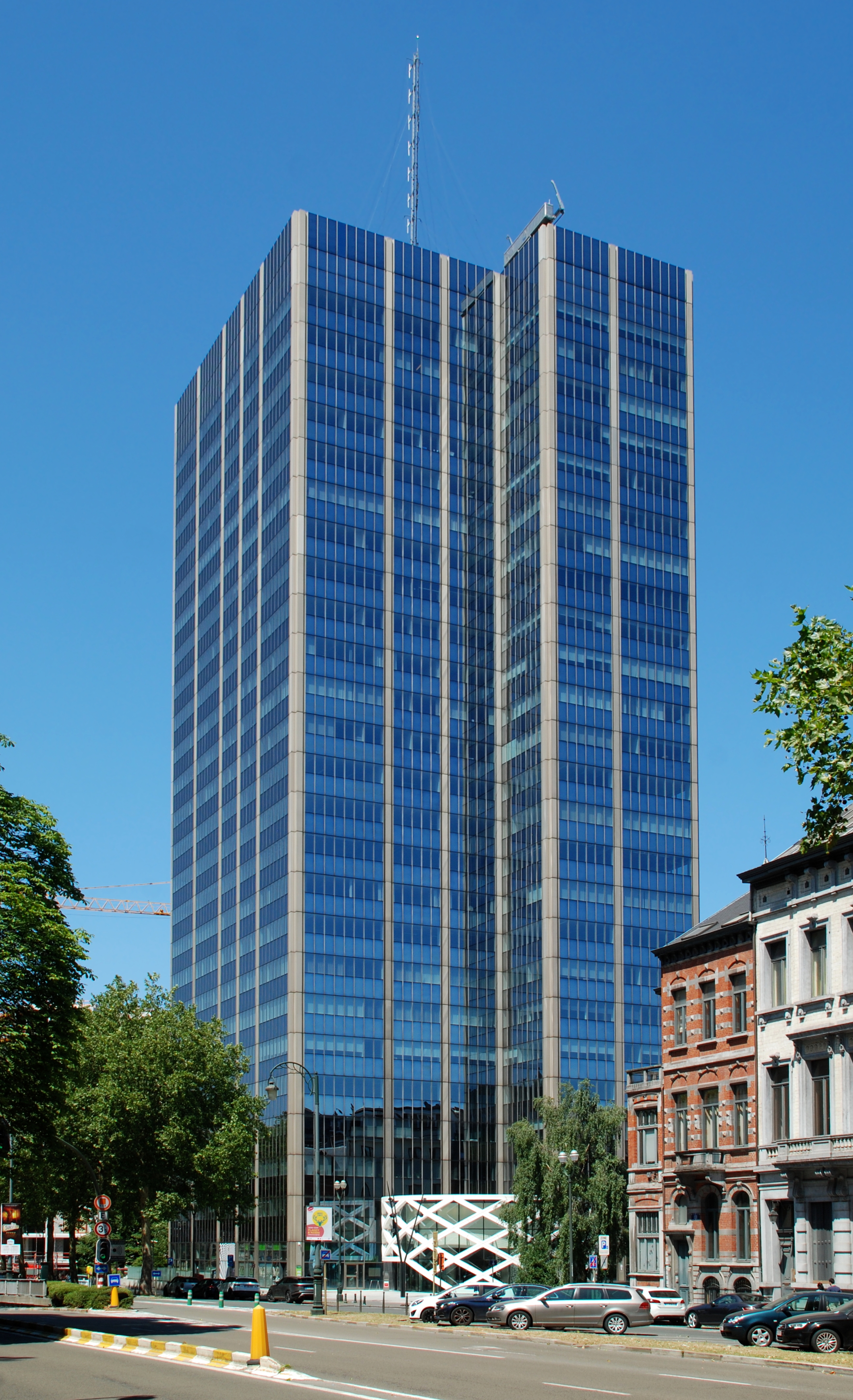
Blue Tower

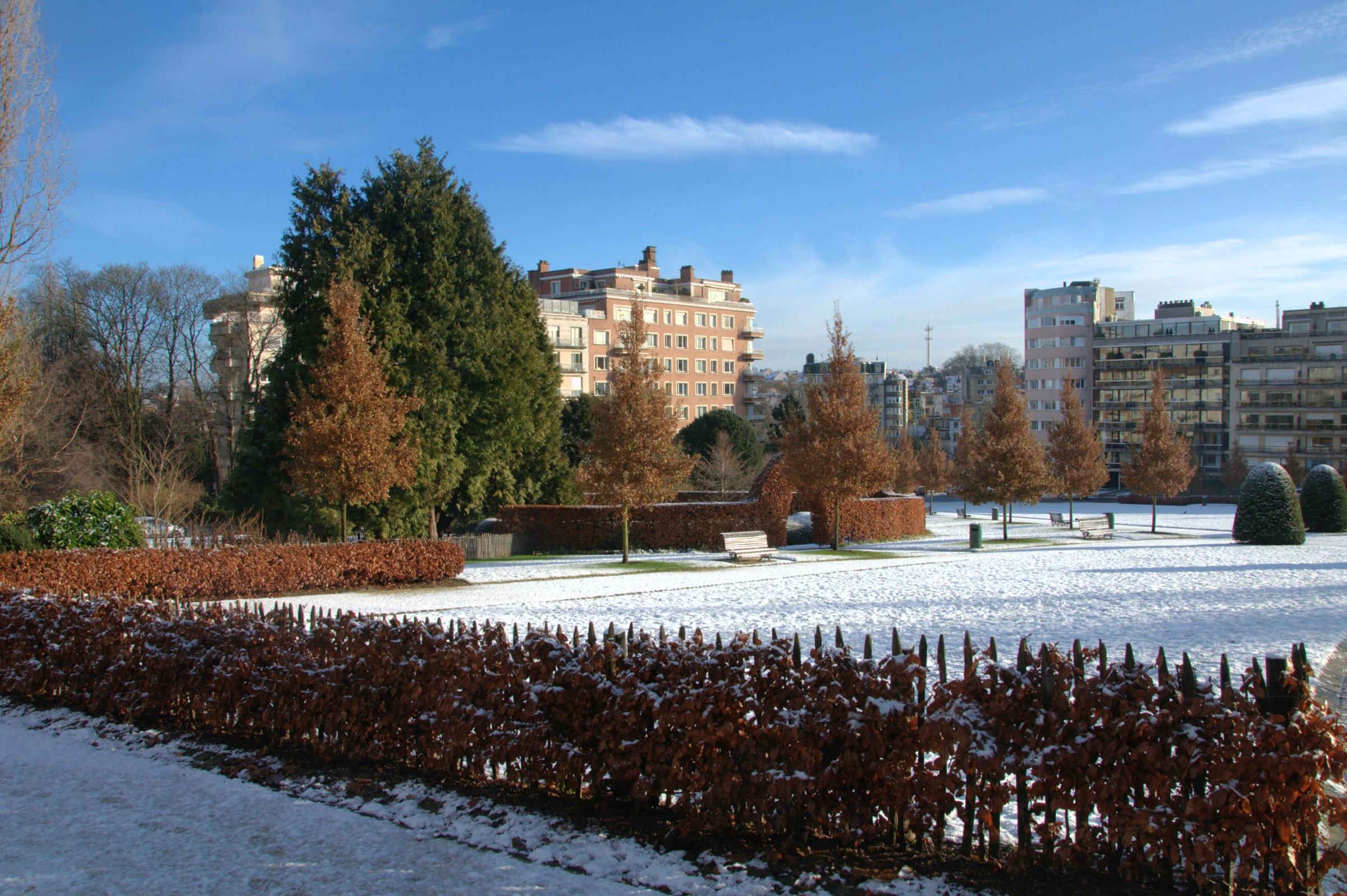
King's Garden

==== Bois de la Cambre/Ter Kamerenbos ====
At the end of Avenue Louise lies the Bois de la Cambre/Ter Kamerenbos. This English-style park, forming a natural offshoot of the Sonian Forest, owes its name to the nearby La Cambre Abbey. At its entrance are the two neoclassical former octroi pavilions (French: pavillons d'octroi) of the Namur Gate, as well as Brussels' most prestigious residential area: the Square du Bois/Bossquare.

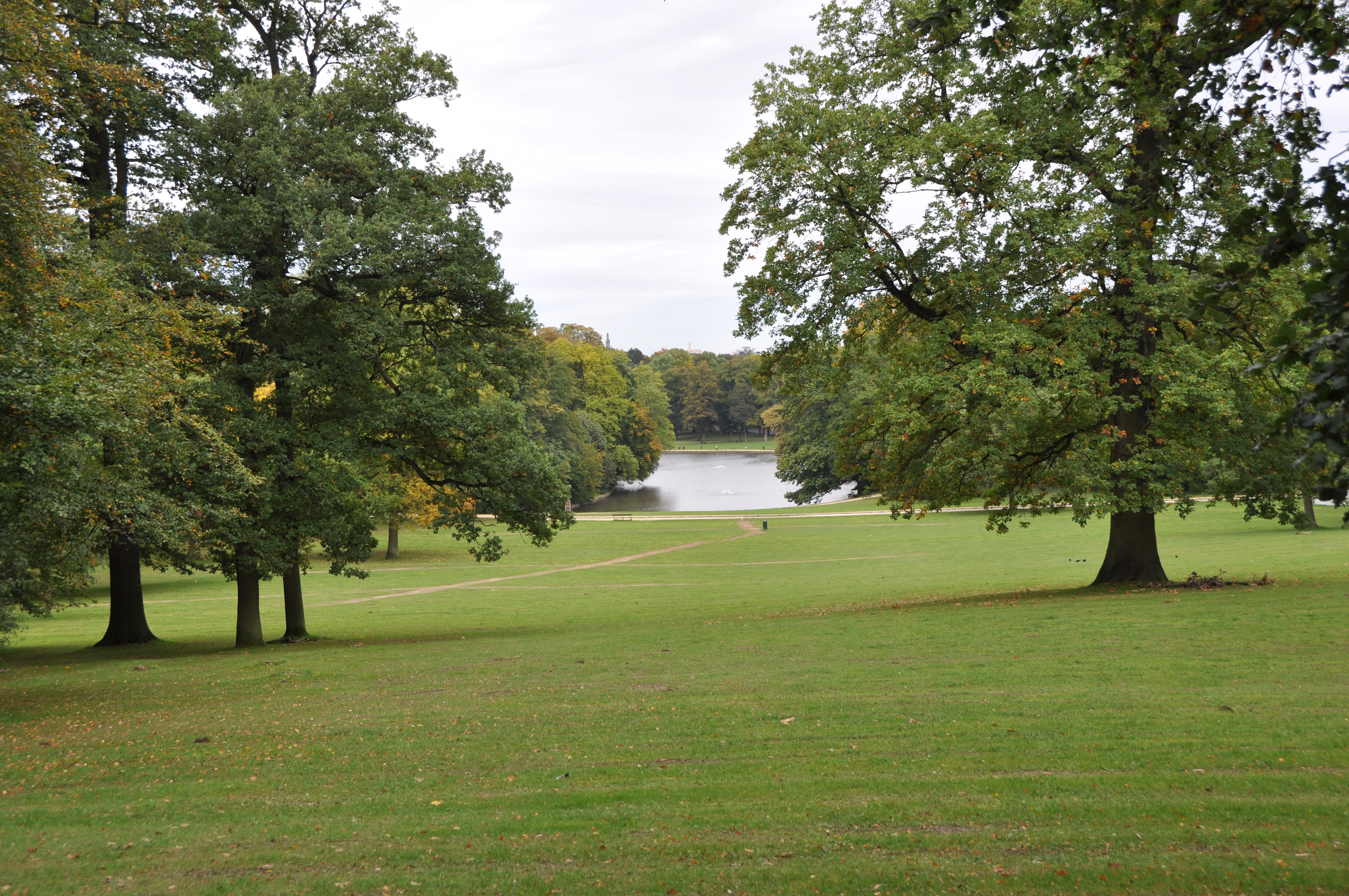
Bois de la Cambre/Ter Kamerenbos

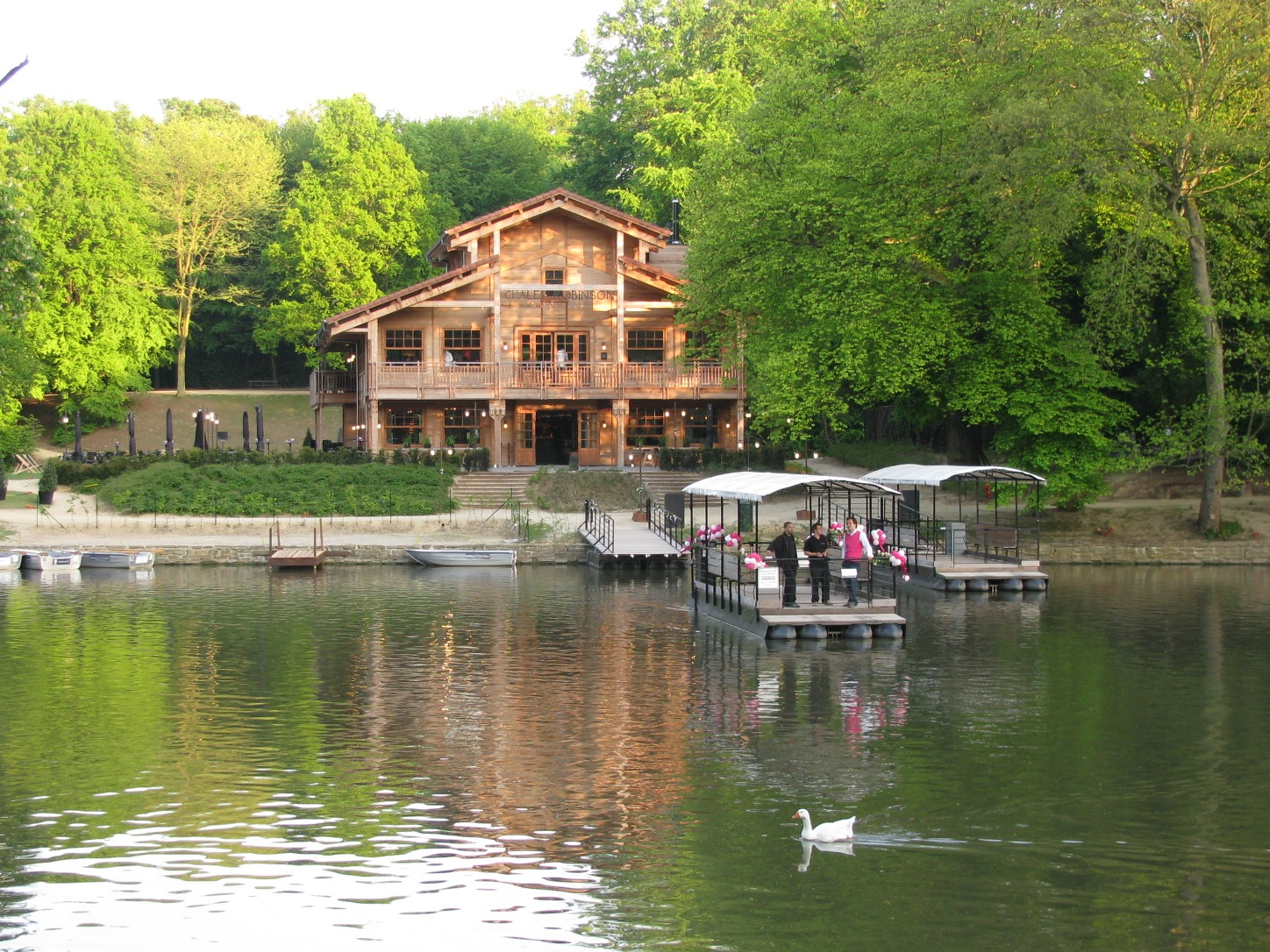
Chalet Robinson

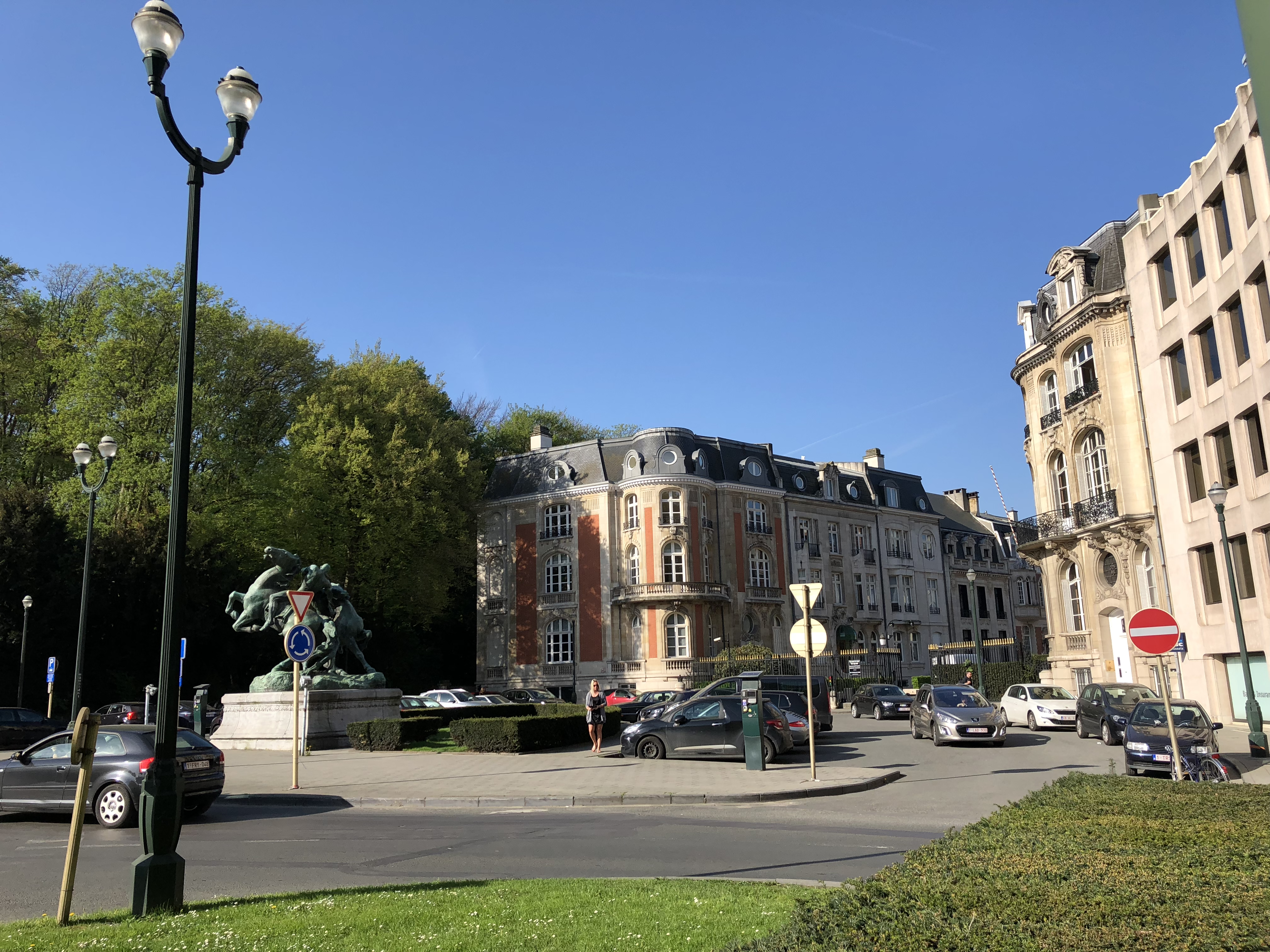
Entrance of the Square du Bois/Bossquare

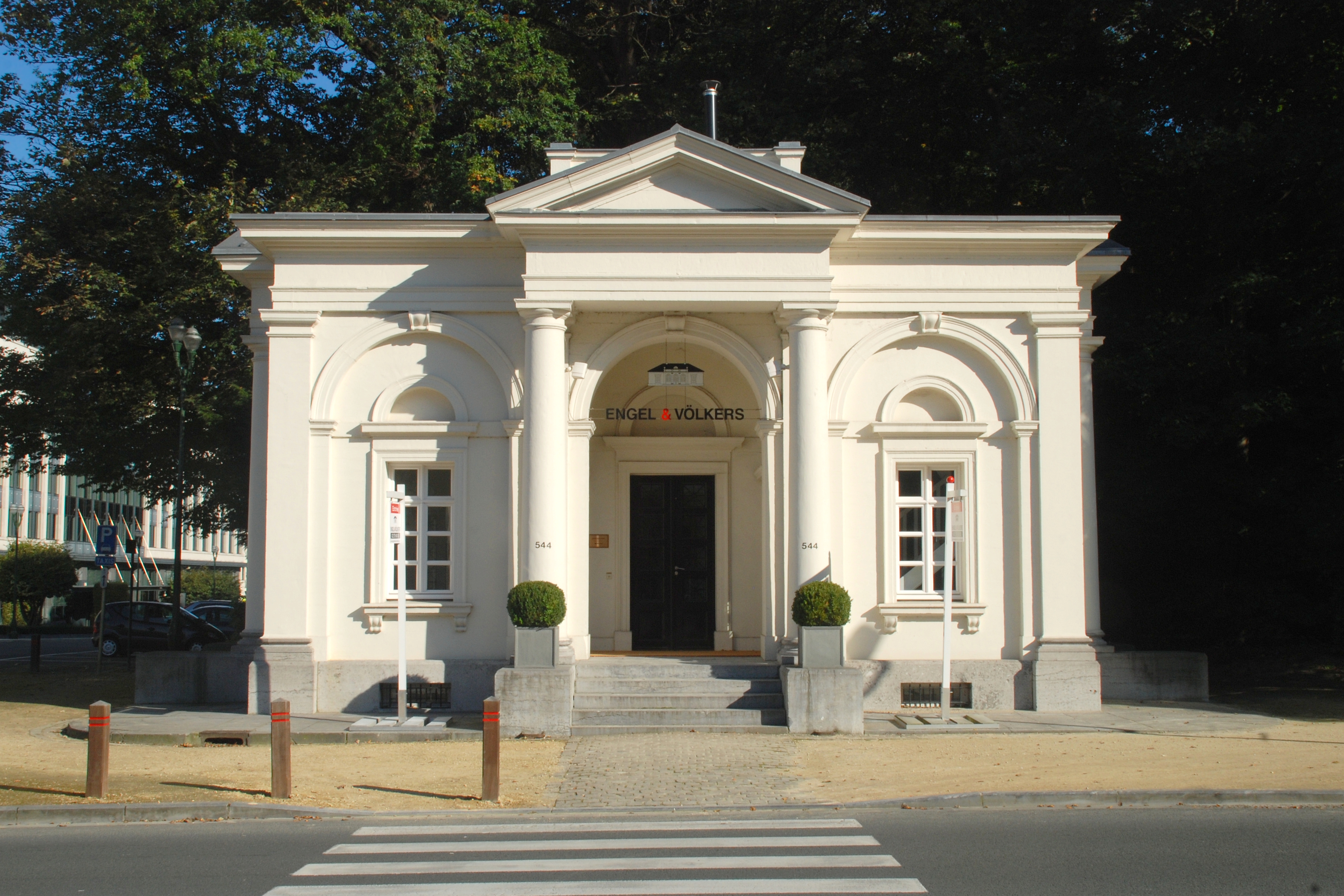
Former octroi pavilion at the entrance of the Bois de la Cambre

==== Solbosch/Solbos ====
The Solbosch/Solbos Plateau is located between the territory of the City of Brussels and Ixelles. In the strict sense, it concerns the north of the Boondael/Boondaal district, just east of the Bois de la Cambre and west of Ixelles Cemetery. The name is derived from 's wolfs bosch, a wood that was originally part of the Sonian Forest. The district was the site of the Brussels International Exposition of 1910, as evidenced by the Avenue des Nations/Natiënlaan (now the Avenue Franklin Roosevelt/Franklin Rooseveltlaan), and the Delune House, a former Art Nouveau café-restaurant, converted into an embassy. The Solbosch/Solbos campus of the Université libre de Bruxelles (ULB), a French-speaking university, with about 20,000 students, is also situated there.

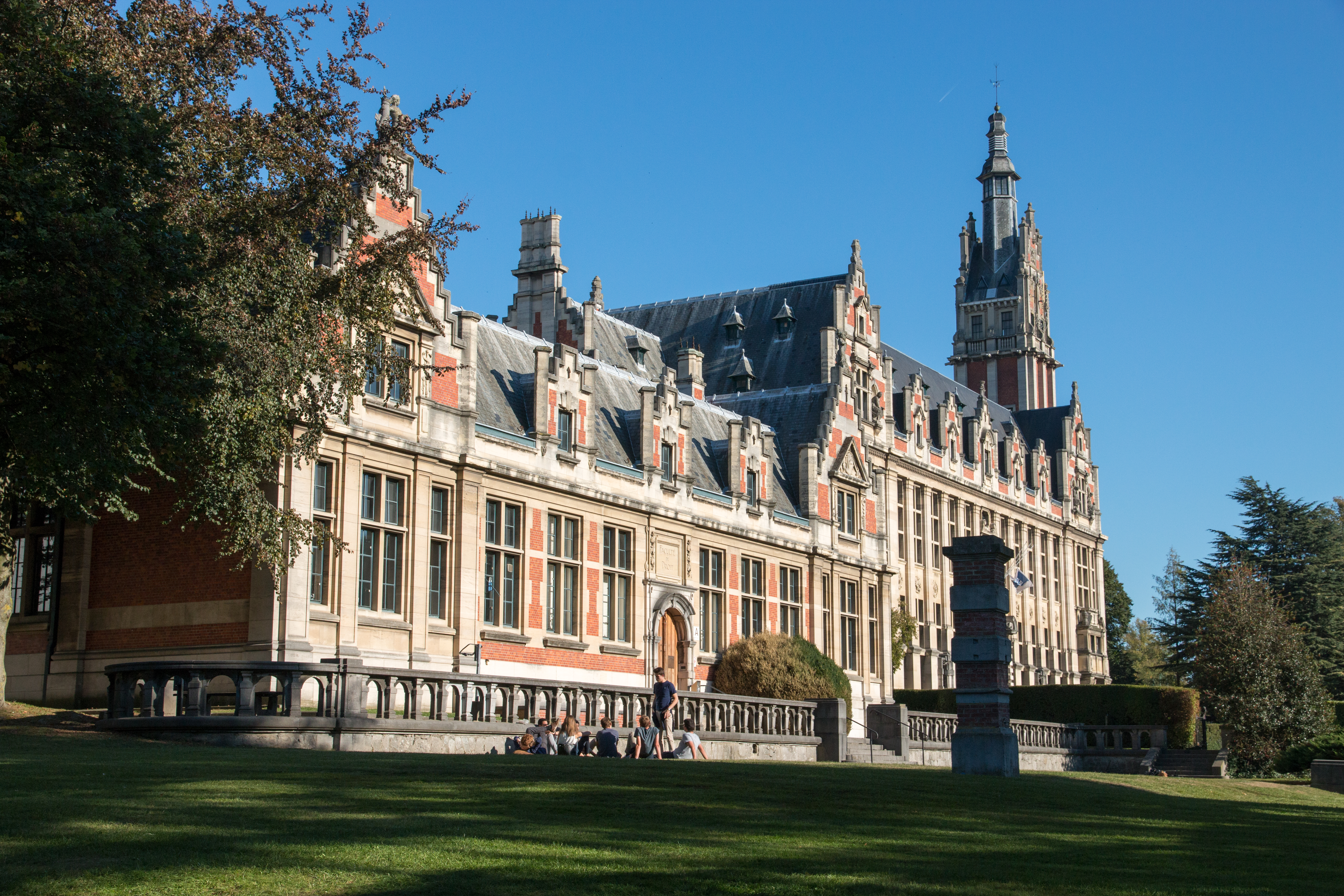
Solbosch/Solbos campus of the Université libre de Bruxelles (ULB)

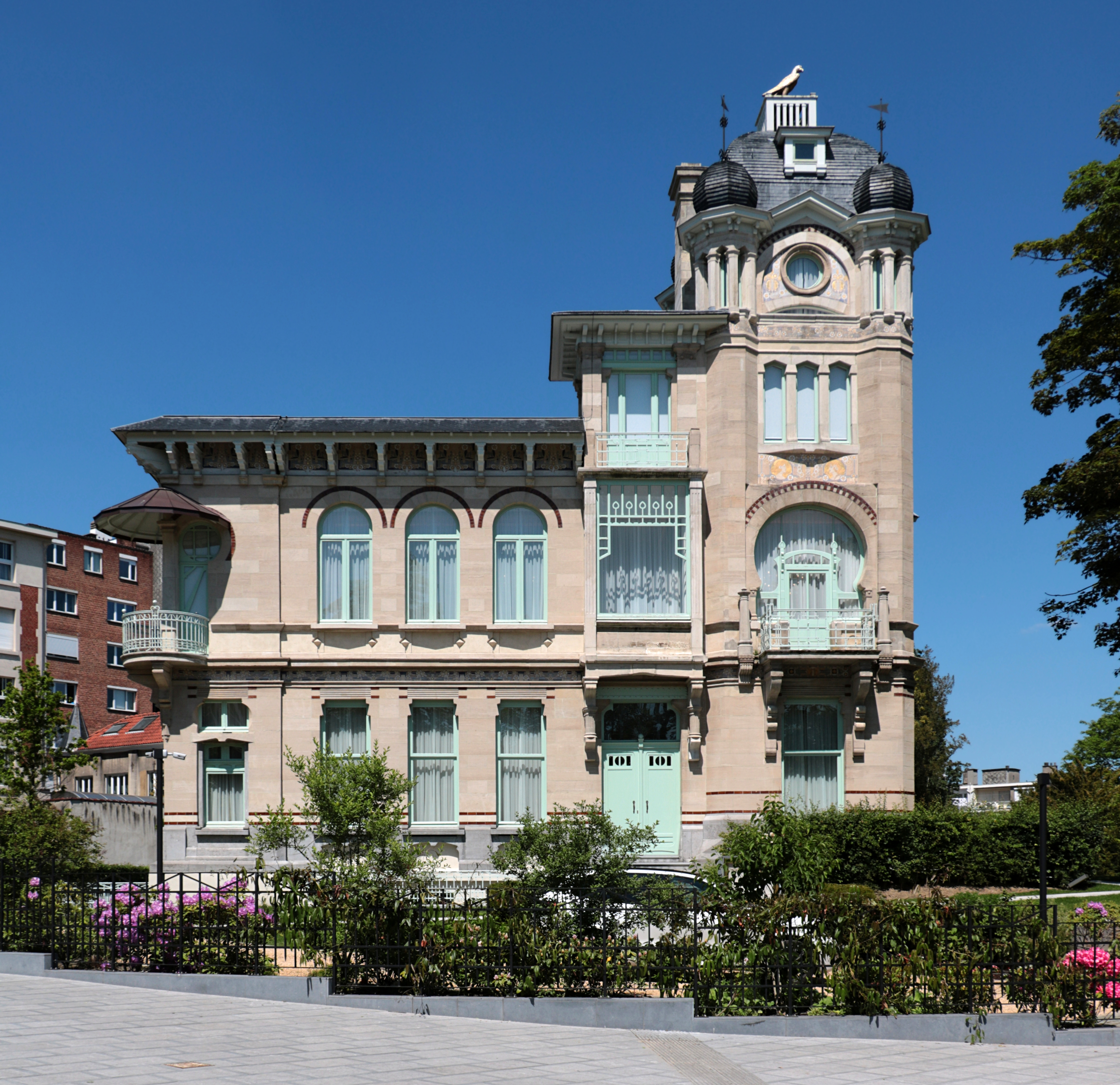
Delune House

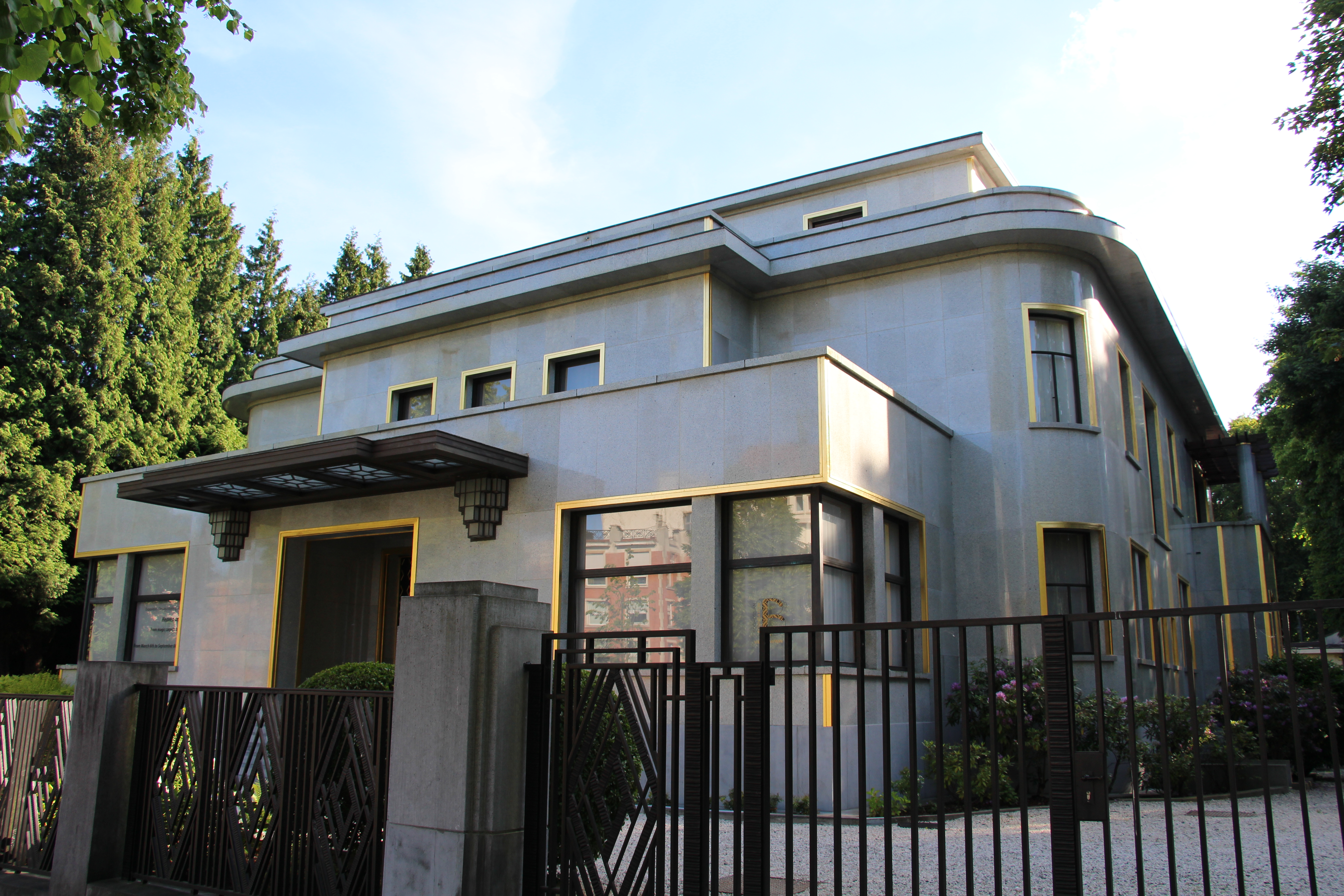
Villa Empain

== Other municipalities ==
=== Anderlecht ===
==== Historical centre ====
The historical centre of Anderlecht is the municipality's central district. Formerly known as Rinck, it is divided into several sectors:

- The Saint-Guidon/Sint Guido district, also called the Vaillance/Dapperheid district, is the meeting point for those who hail to the heart of Anderlecht. It is also where the Place de la Vaillance/Dapperheidsplein (Anderlecht's central square), the Church of St. Guido, the Place de Linde/De Lindeplein, as well as Anderlecht's main schools are located. The Rue Wayez/Wayezstraat is the municipality's main shopping street. It is centred on the Place of the Resistance/Verzetsplein and some neighbouring streets.
- The smaller Aumale district in its northern part mainly comprises the Rue d'Aumale/Aumalestraat and its surrounding streets. It includes the Erasmus House (a museum devoted to the Dutch humanist writer and theologian Erasmus of Rotterdam), the old beguinage (a late medieval lay convent, now a museum dedicated to religious community life), as well as the Bibliothèque de l'Espace Maurice Carême French-language public library.
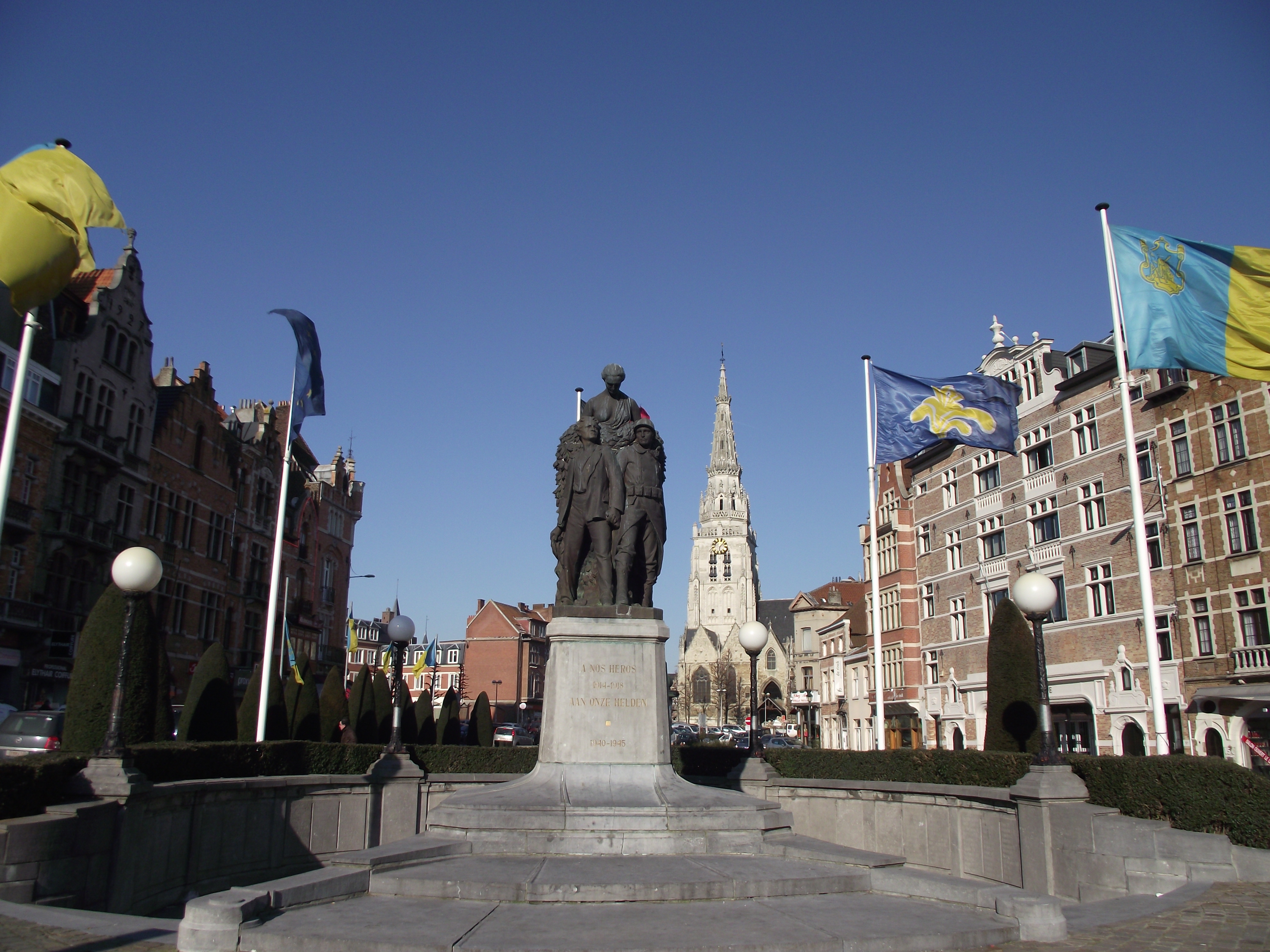
Place de la Vaillance/Dapperheidsplein and Church of St. Guido

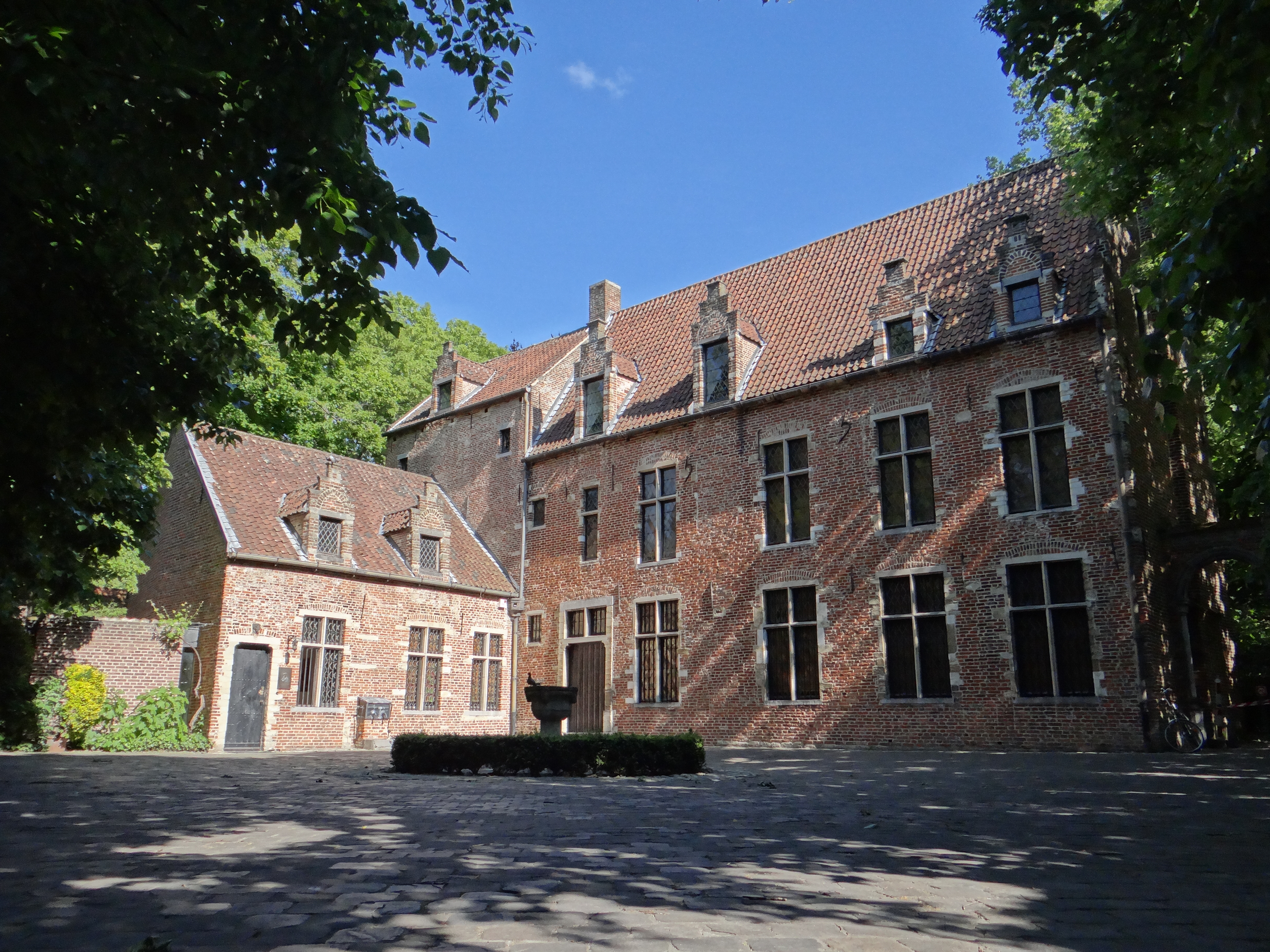
Erasmus House

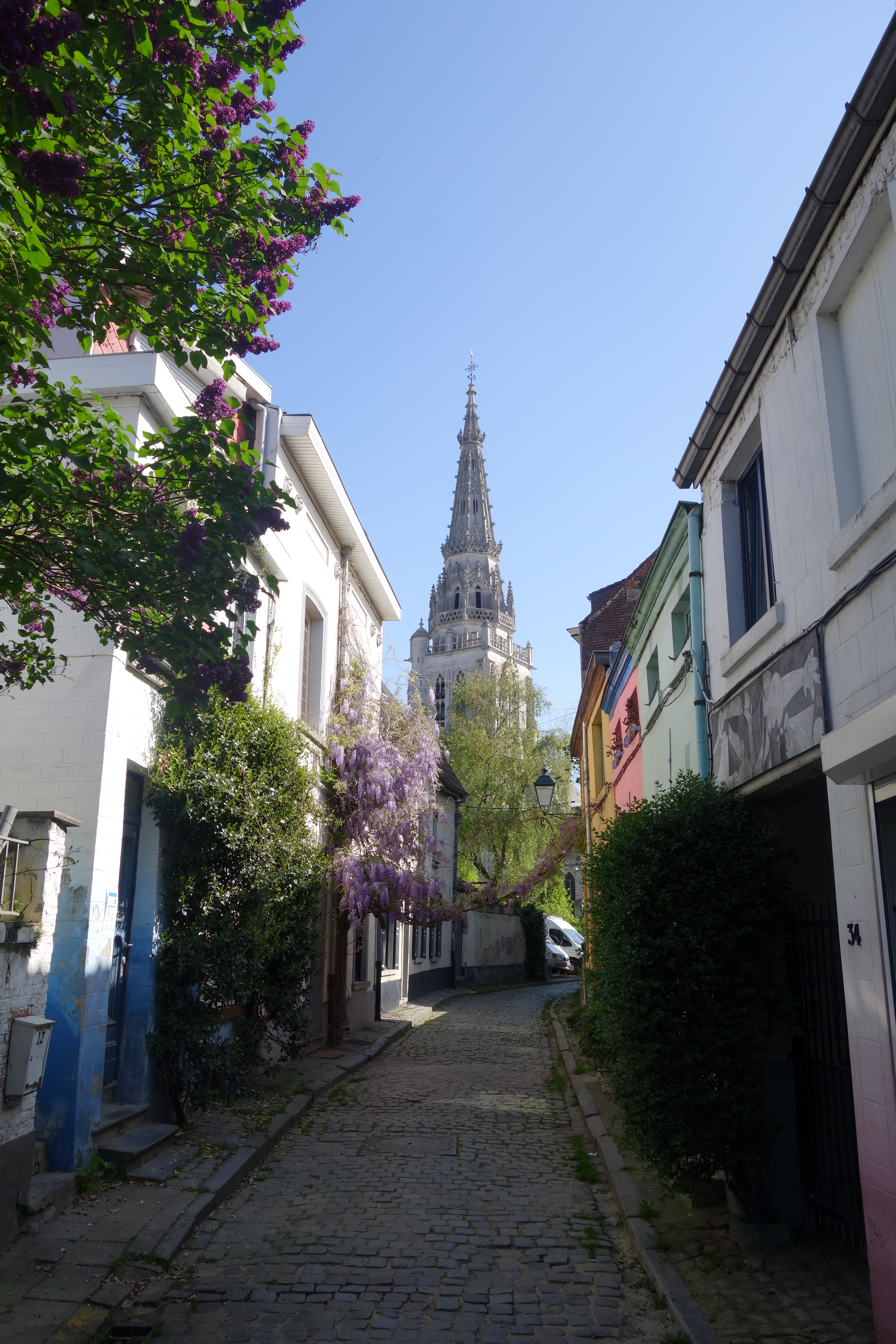
Rue Porselein / Porseleinstraat

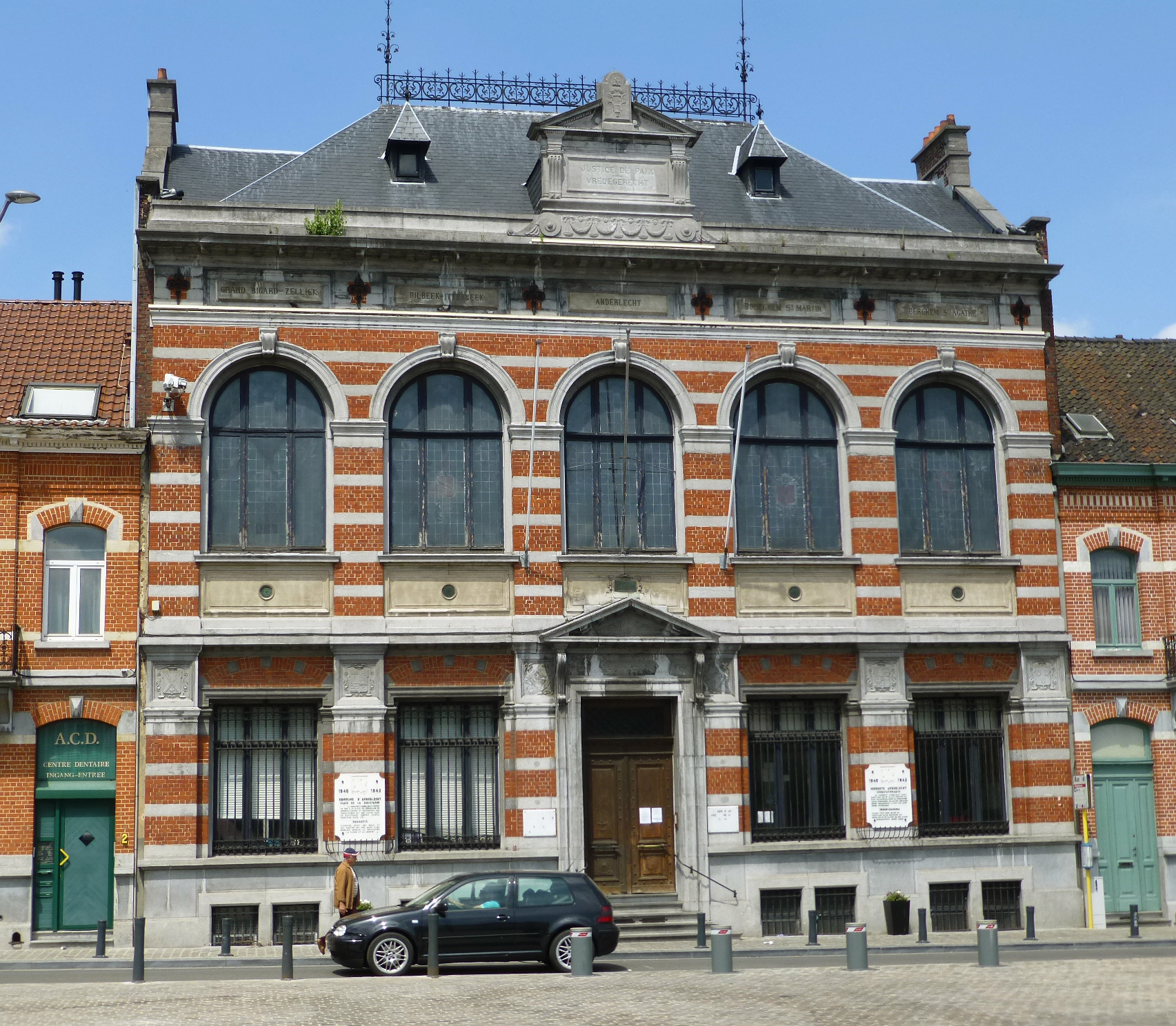
Justice de Paix of Anderlecht

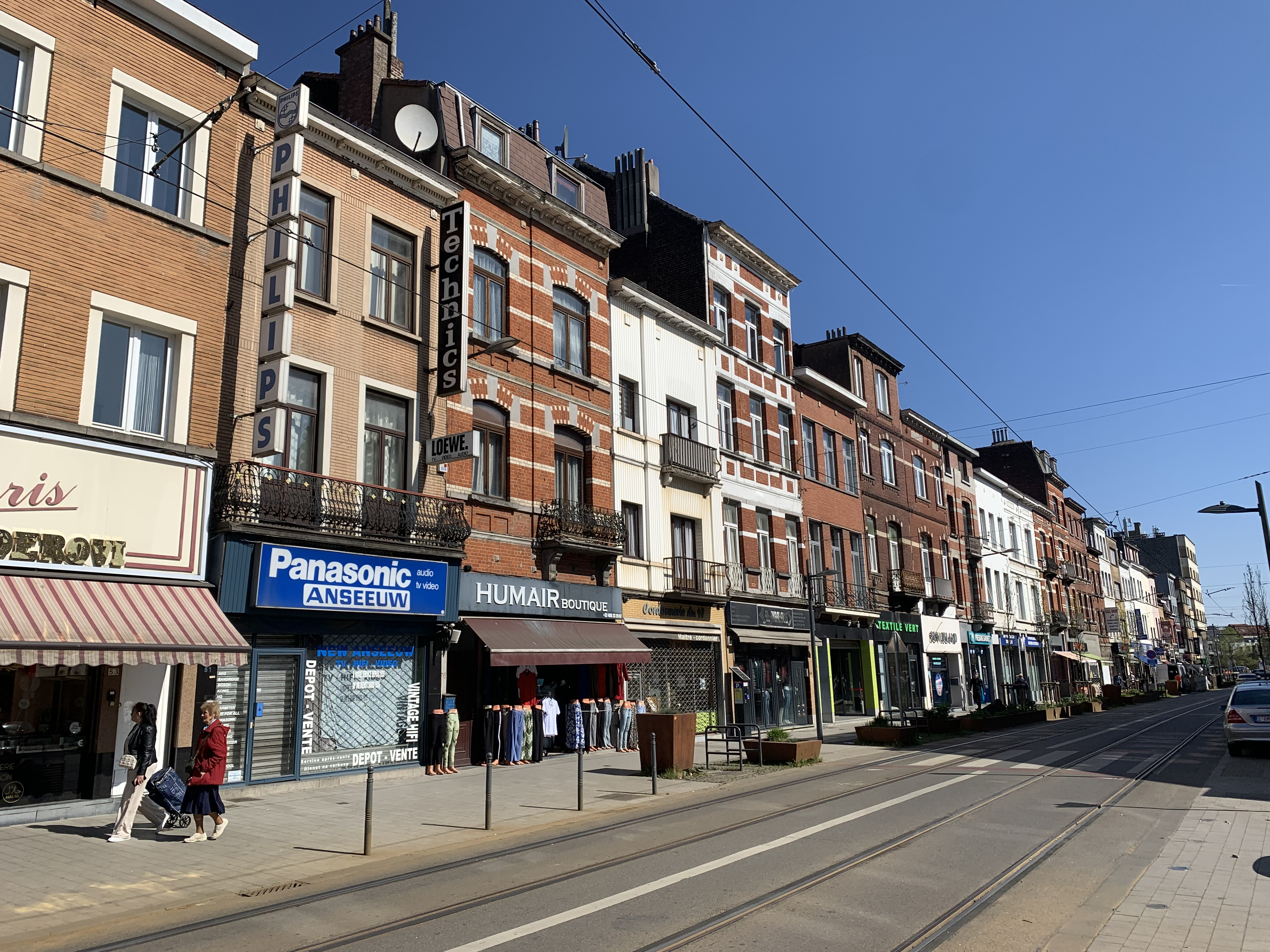
Rue Wayez/Wayezstraat

==== Cureghem/Kuregem ====
Located in the north-east of Anderlecht, Cureghem/Kuregem is one of the municipality's largest and most populated districts. It developed during the Industrial Revolution along the Brussels–Charleroi Canal and is currently in a fragile social and economic situation due to the decline of its economy and the poor quality of some of its housing. Between 1836 and 1991, the district housed the Royal School of Veterinary Medicine, now moved to Liège but often still referred to as Cureghem. The old campus, listed as protected heritage, has undergone a large rehabilitation process. Three listed buildings—the former Atlas Brewery, the old power station, and the former Moulart Mill—are testaments to the old industrial activities next to the waterway. The Municipal Hall of Anderlecht is located on the Place du Conseil/Raadsplein, in the heart of this district. In its lower part, bordering the City of Brussels, are the Square de l'Aviation/Luchtvaartsquare and the Parc de la Rosée/Dauwpark.

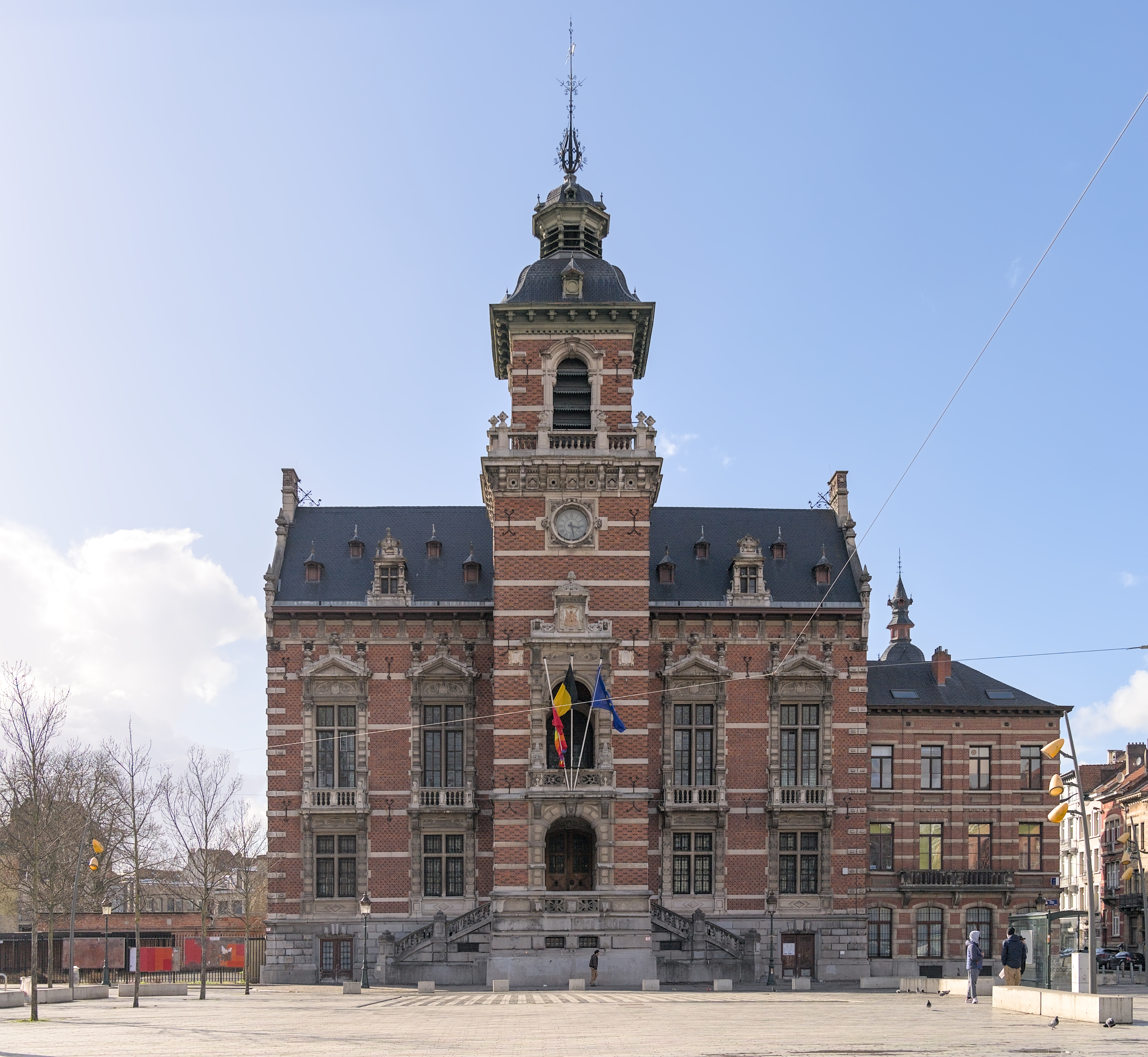
Anderlecht's Municipal Hall

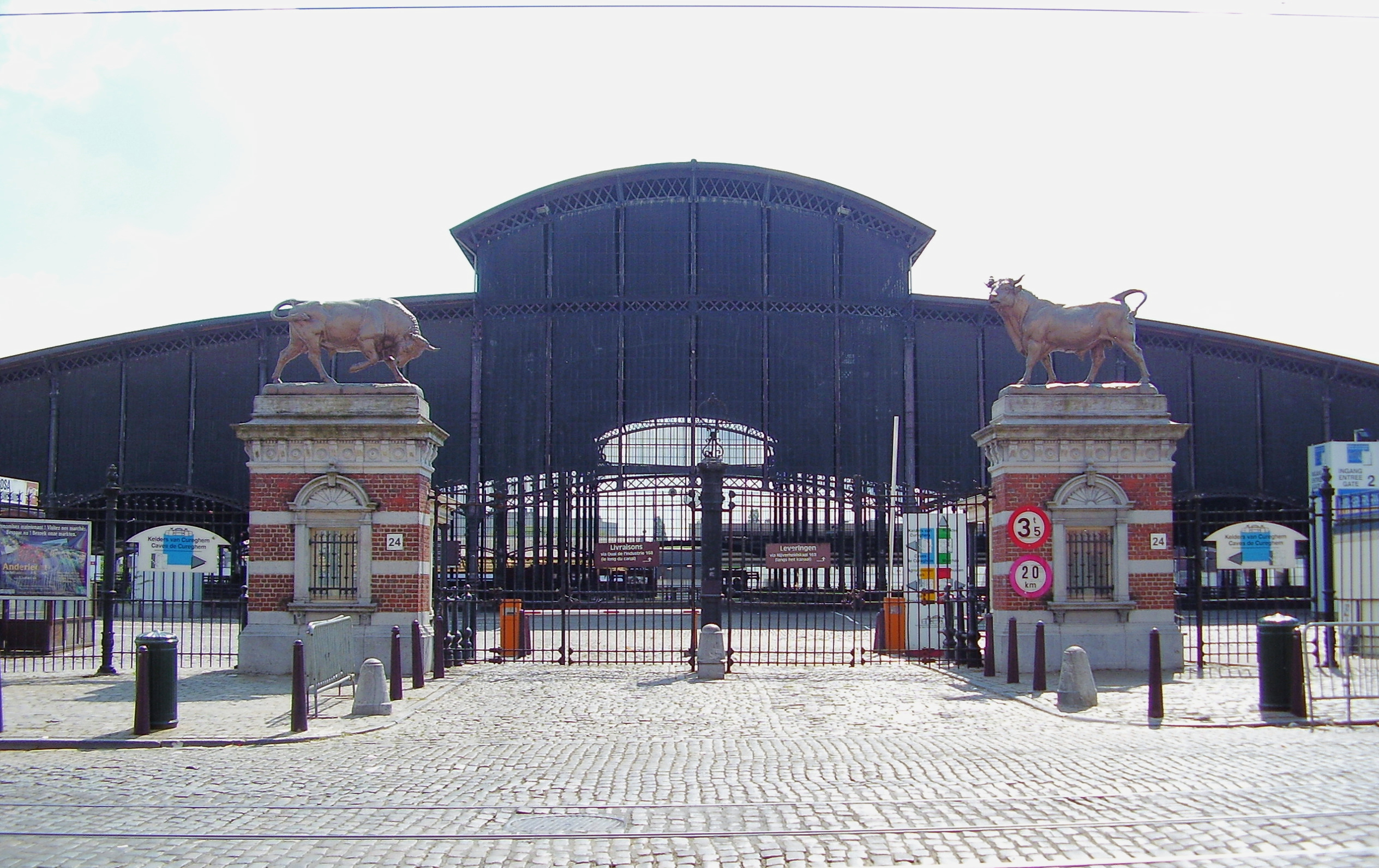
Abattoirs of Anderlecht

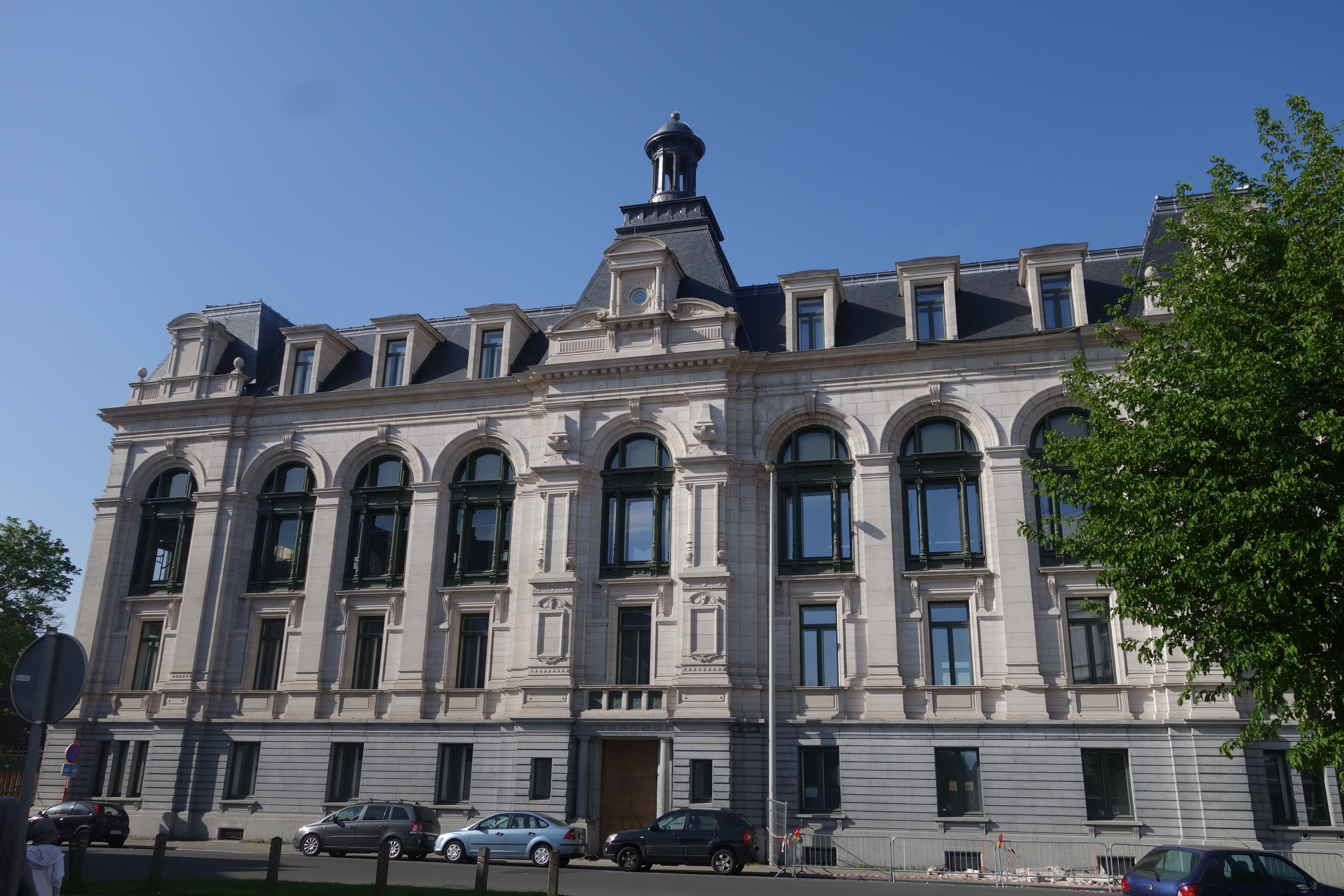
Royal School of Veterinary Medicine

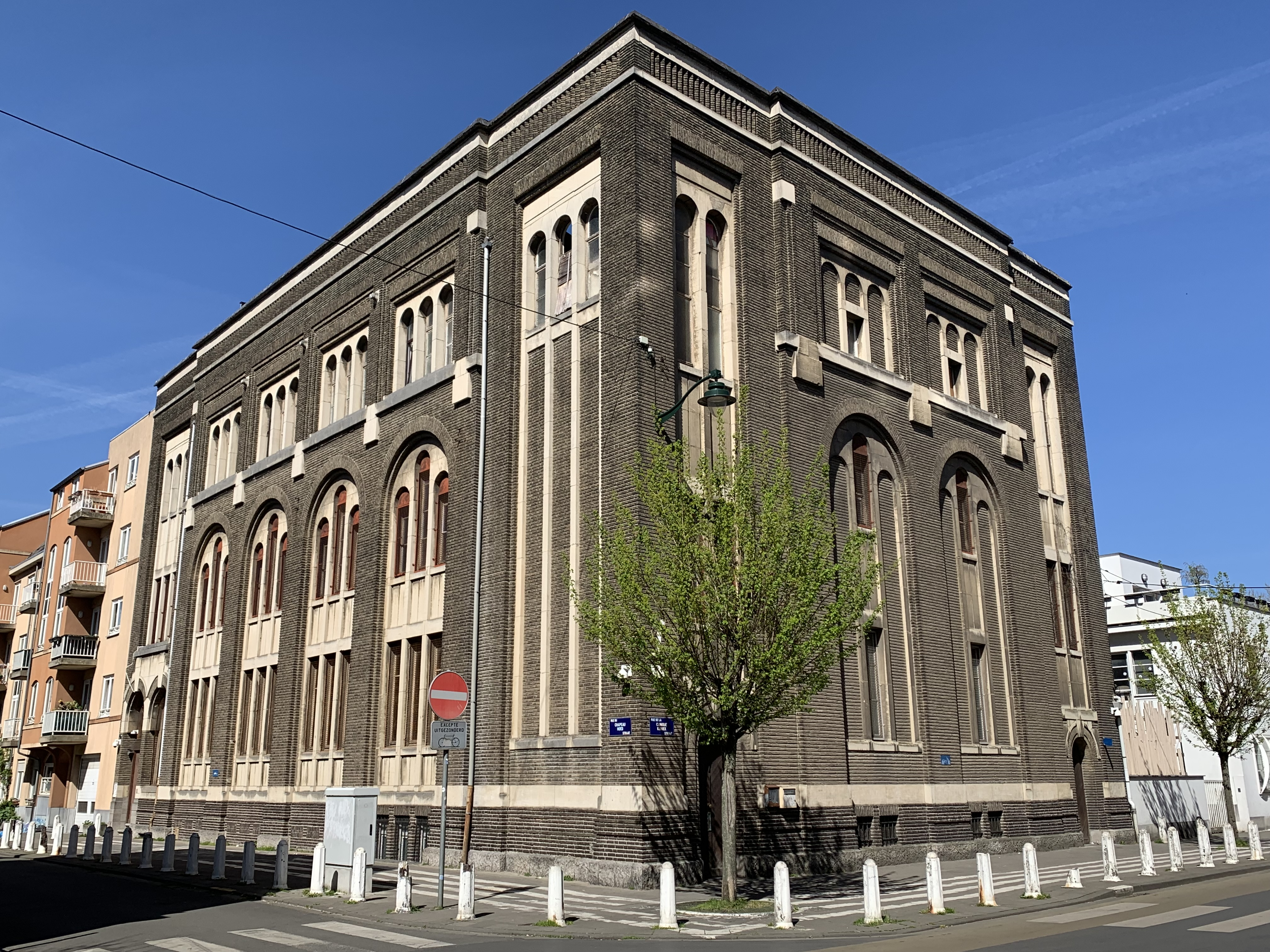
Synagogue of Anderlecht

==== Meir ====
Located to the south of the historical centre of Anderlecht, this district is centred on the Meir Roundabout and Astrid Park (formerly called Meir Park), where the football club R.S.C. Anderlecht plays its home matches in the Constant Vanden Stock Stadium. Planned shortly before the First World War, the development of this residential neighbourhood took place mainly between the two world wars. Its layout, characterised by broad avenues, villas and row houses interspersed with green spaces, reflects the planned transition from former rural land into an urbanised residential zone. Aimed at the middle class, it forms an extremely coherent and well-preserved architectural ensemble in which the Art Deco style predominates.

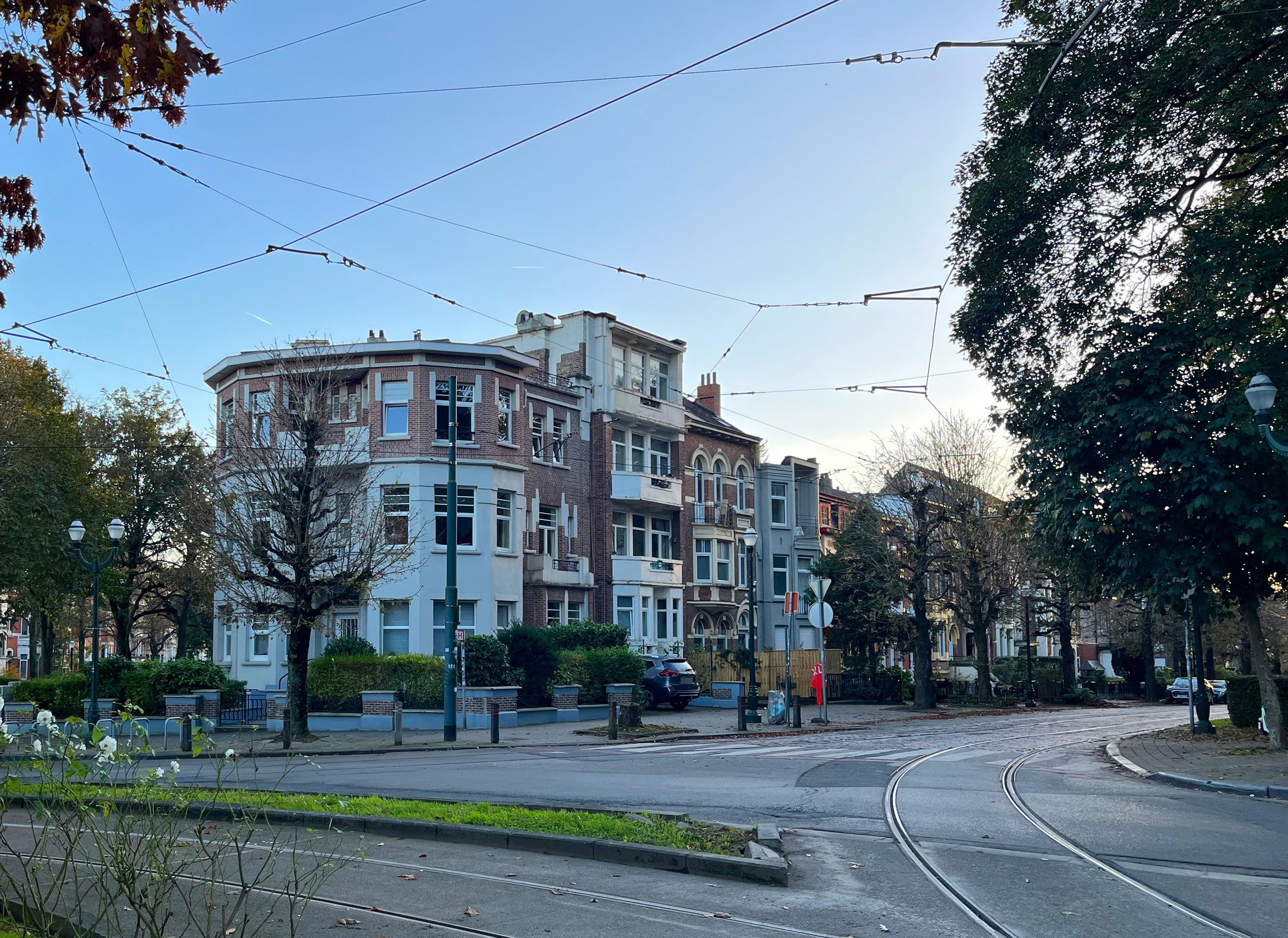
Meir Roundabout

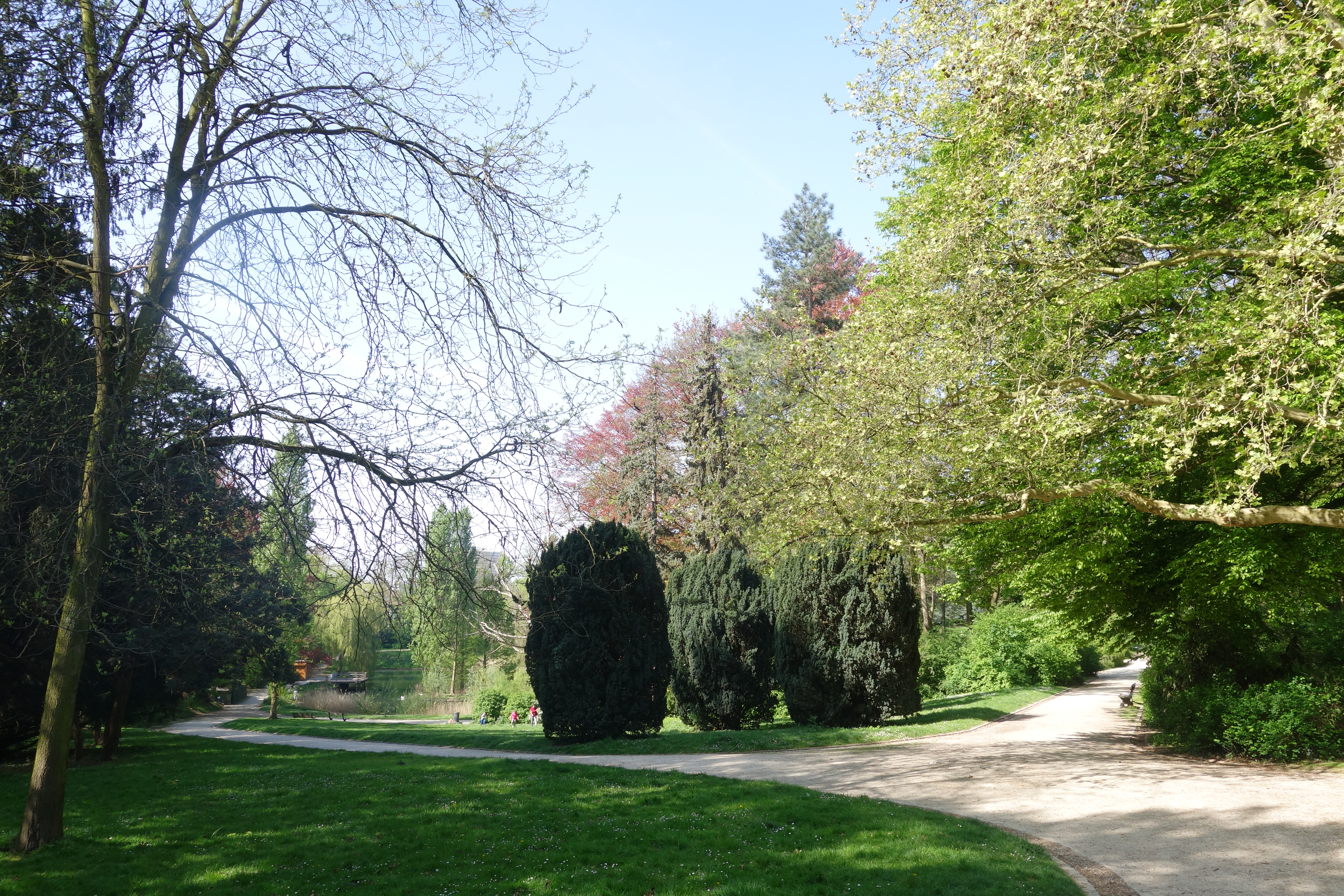
Astrid Park

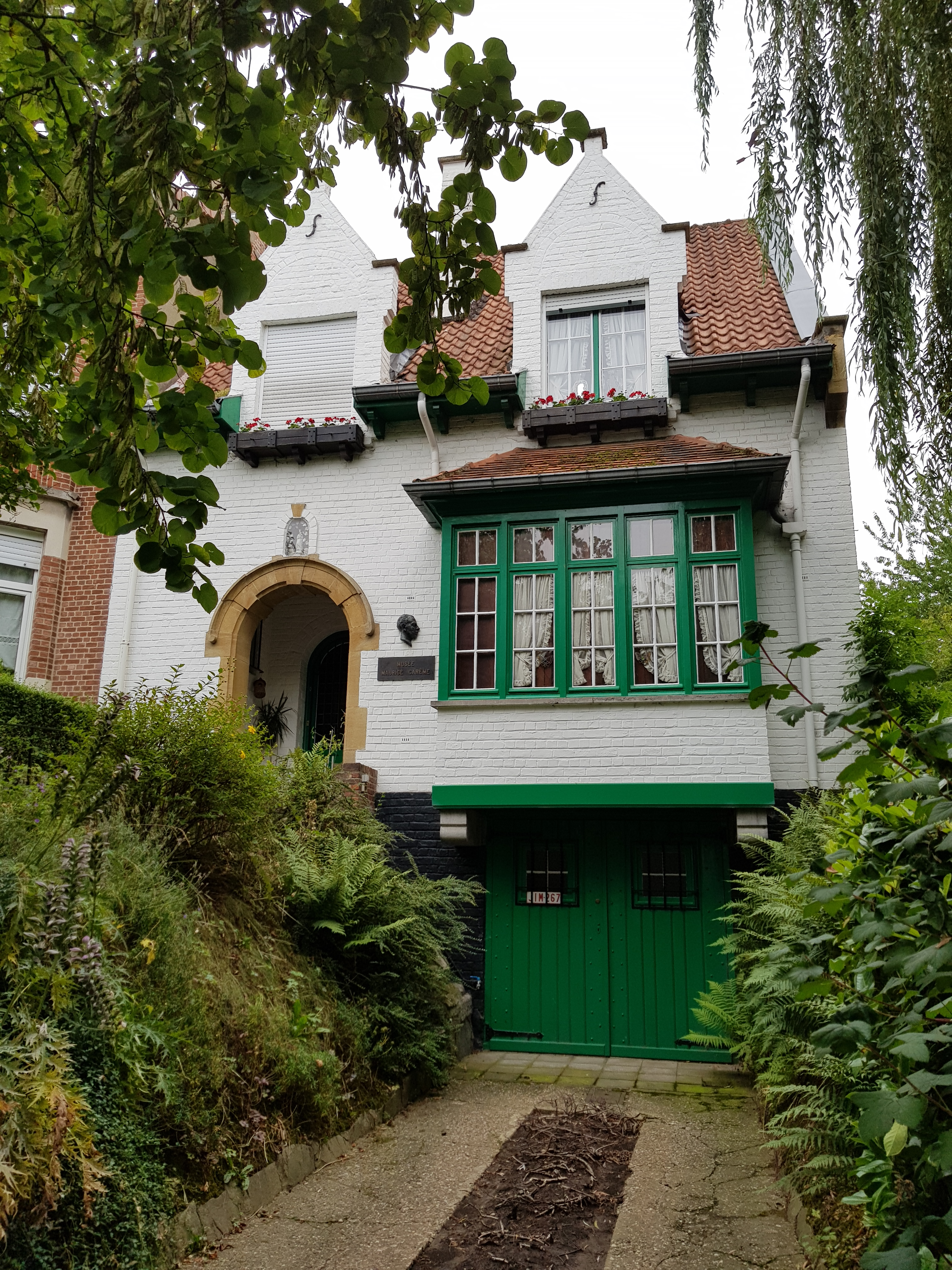
Maurice Carême Museum

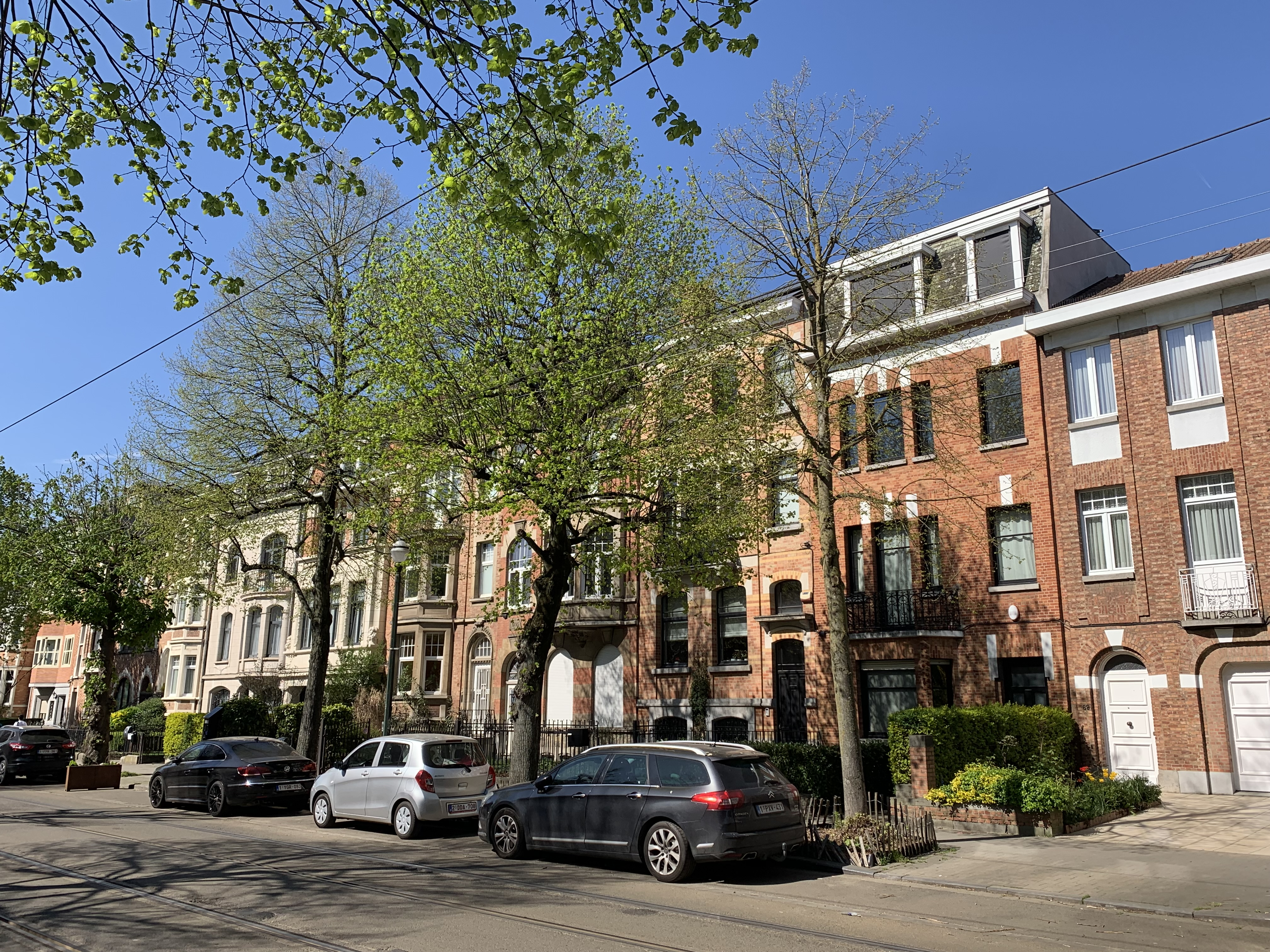
Avenue Paul Janson/Paul Jansonlaan

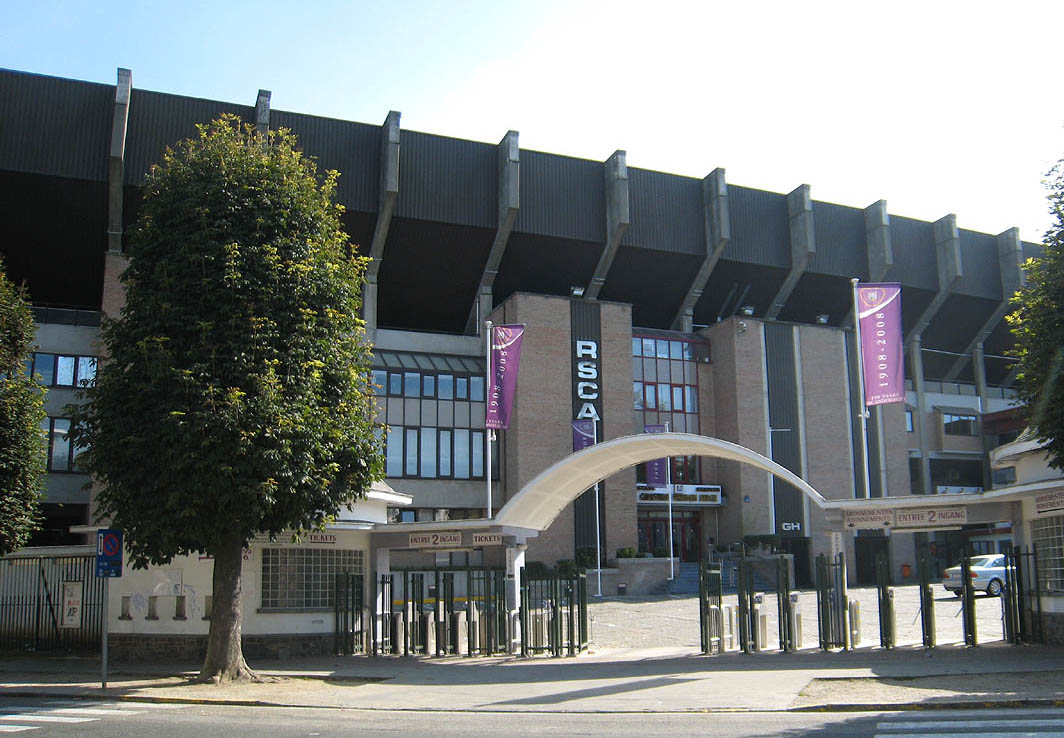
Constant Vanden Stock Stadium

==== Veeweyde/Veeweide ====
Veeweyde/Veeweide is centrally located in the upper part of Anderlecht, south of the Meir district. The neighbourhood, which takes its name from an old hamlet meaning "pasture", includes the Busselenberg (a residential area centred around the park of the same name), the smaller Musicians' district (a residential area between the Chaussée de Mons/Bergensesteenweg and the Rue Félicien Rops/Félicien Ropsstraat), as well as the Aurore housing estate on the banks of the canal. In recent years, this area has seen urban renewal efforts, with the canal quays being converted into a pedestrian and cycle-friendly promenade.

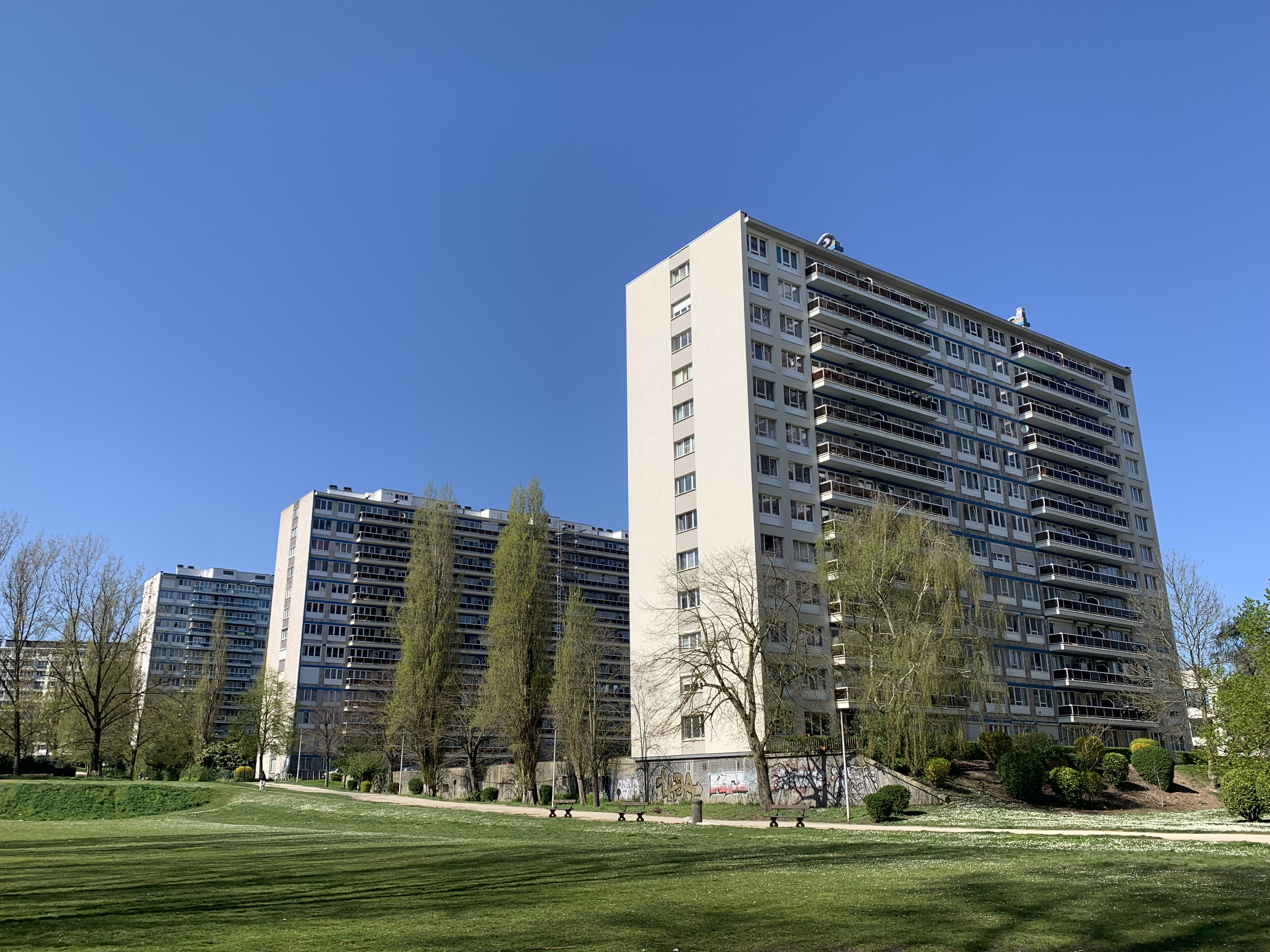
Aurore housing estate

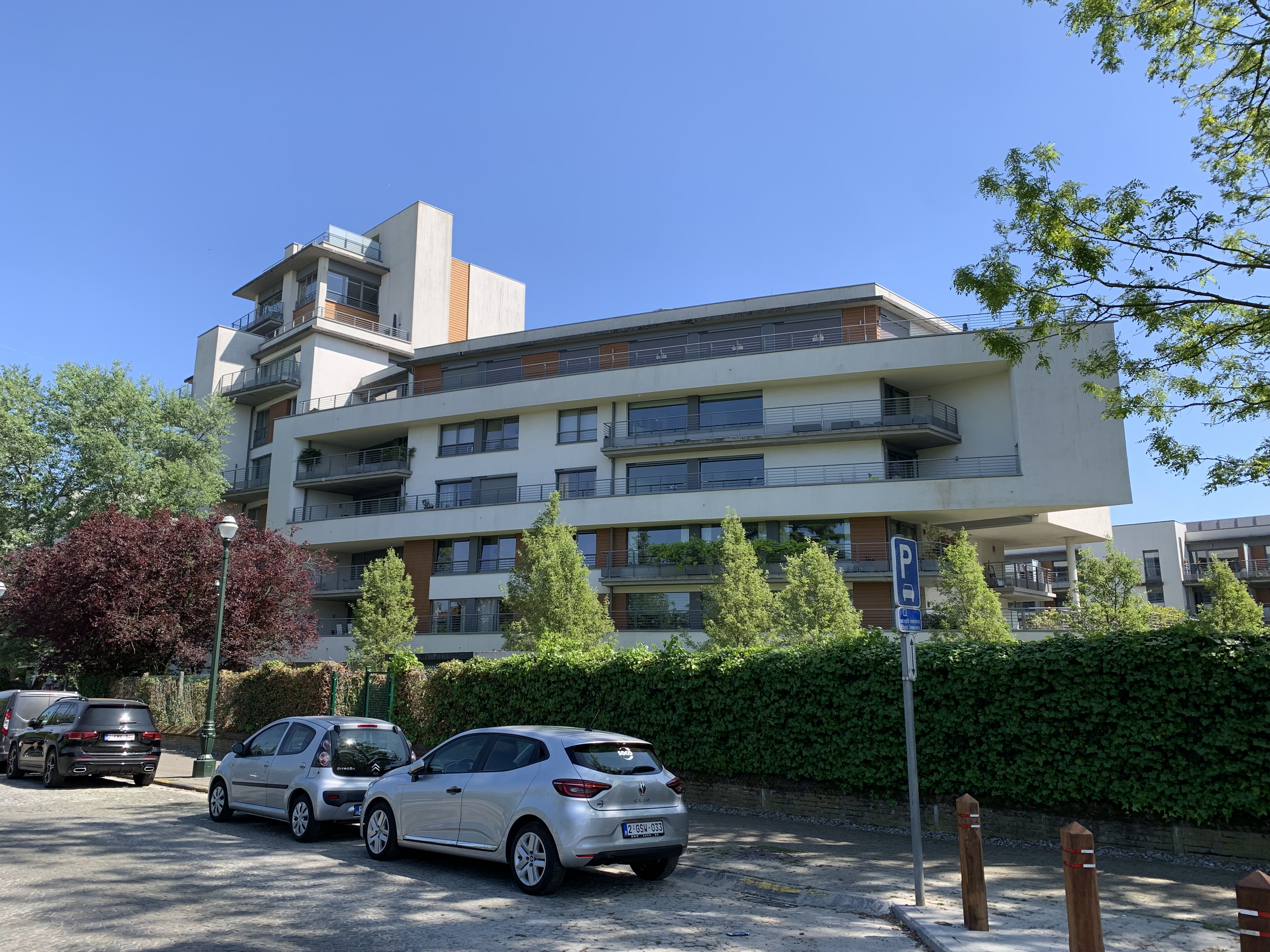
Rue Félicien Rops/Félicien Ropsstraat

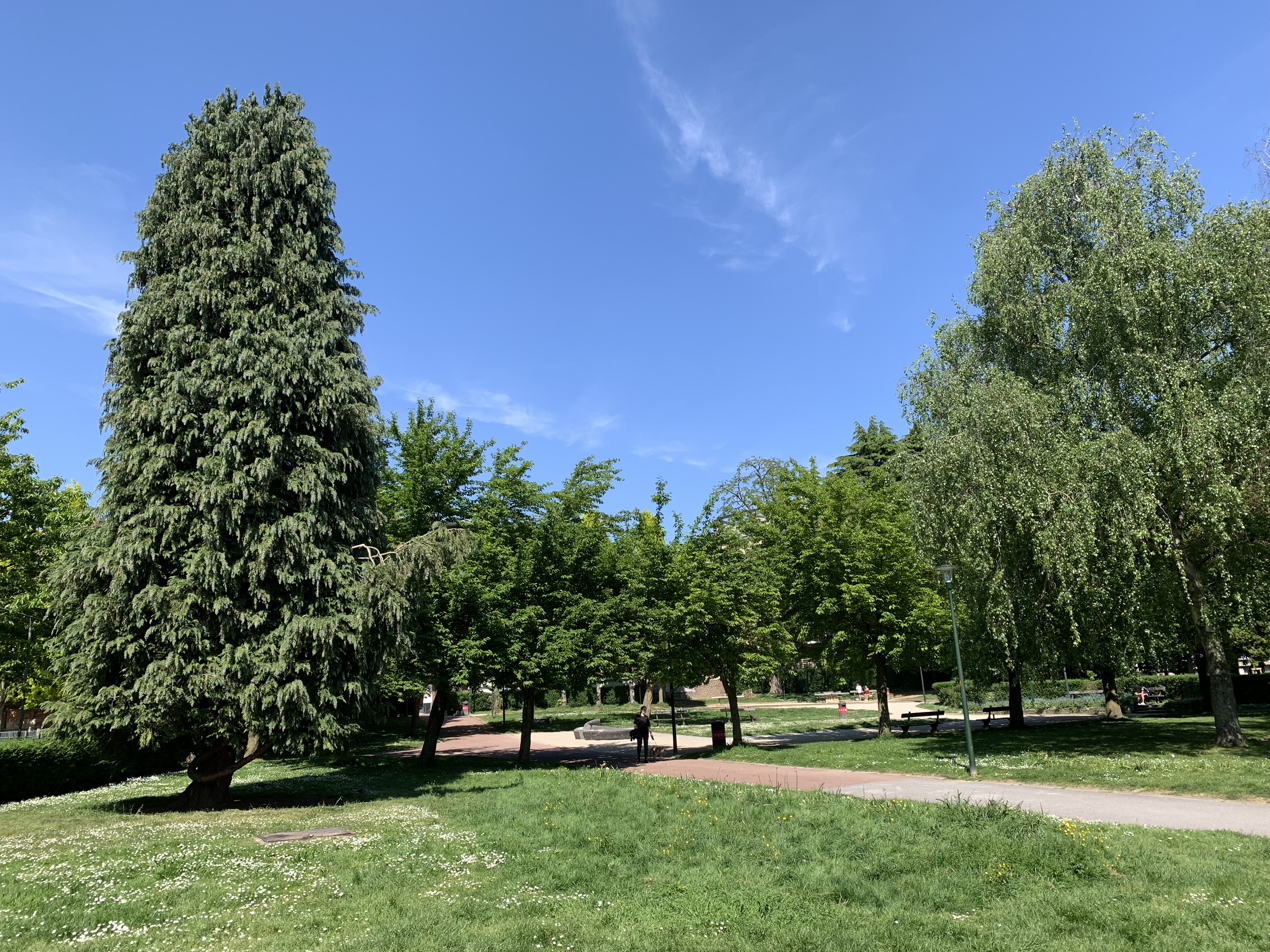
Busselenberg Park

==== La Roue/Het Rad ====
Located in the south of Anderlecht, La Roue/Het Rad ("The Wheel") is one of the municipality's largest districts and one of Brussels' main garden cities. It is crossed by the last end of the Chaussée de Mons in Brussels, and is bounded to the east by the Brussels–Charleroi Canal and to the south by the Flemish municipality of Sint-Pieters-Leeuw, in the Pajottenland. Mostly built in the 1920s, with its modest and picturesque houses, it offers a vision of an early 20th-century working-class neighbourhood. At its southern edge, it is also home to one of the largest agribusiness industry campuses in Belgium: the Food and Chemical Industries Education and Research Center (CERIA/COOVI), as well as large department stores.

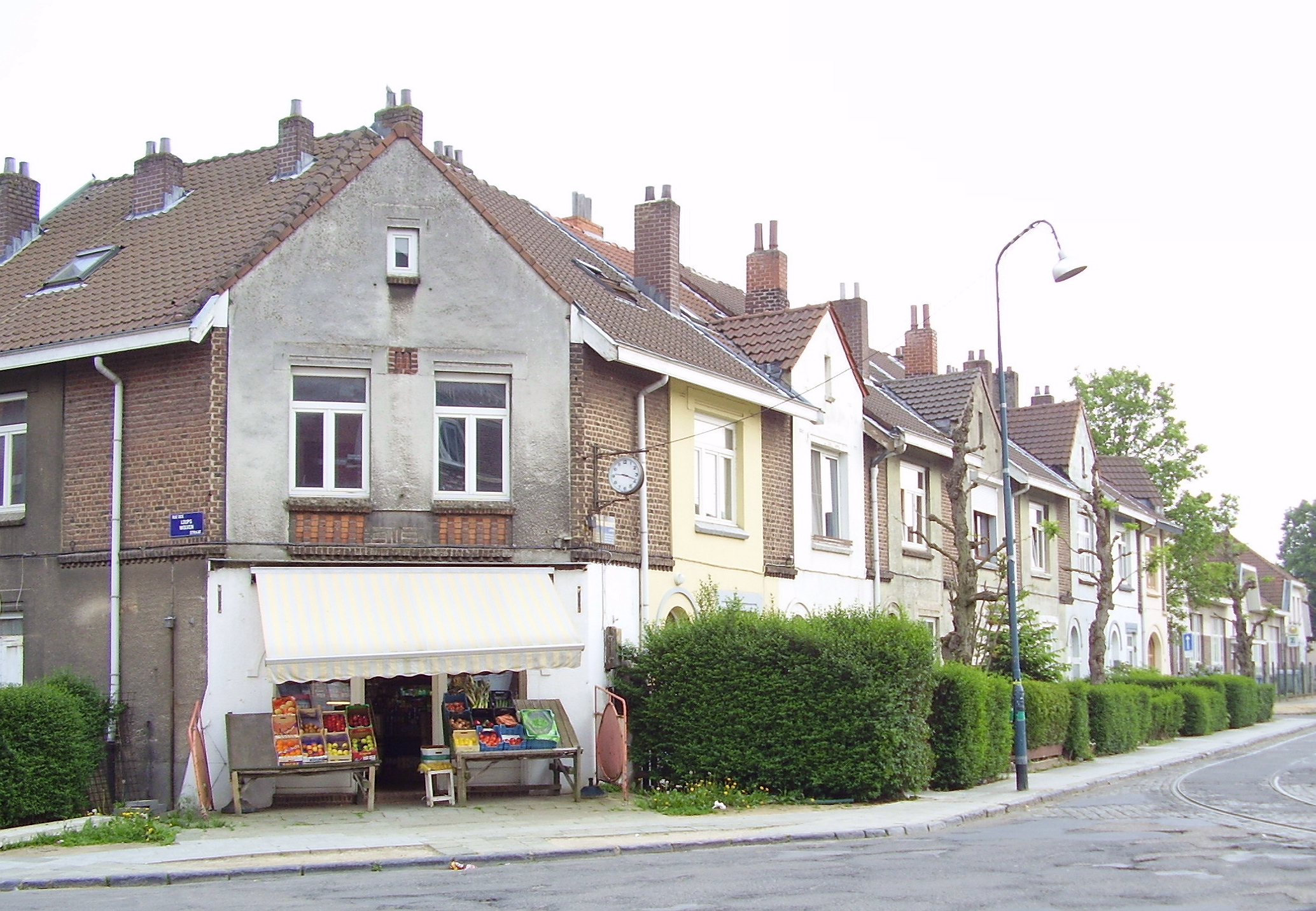
La Roue/Het Rad garden city

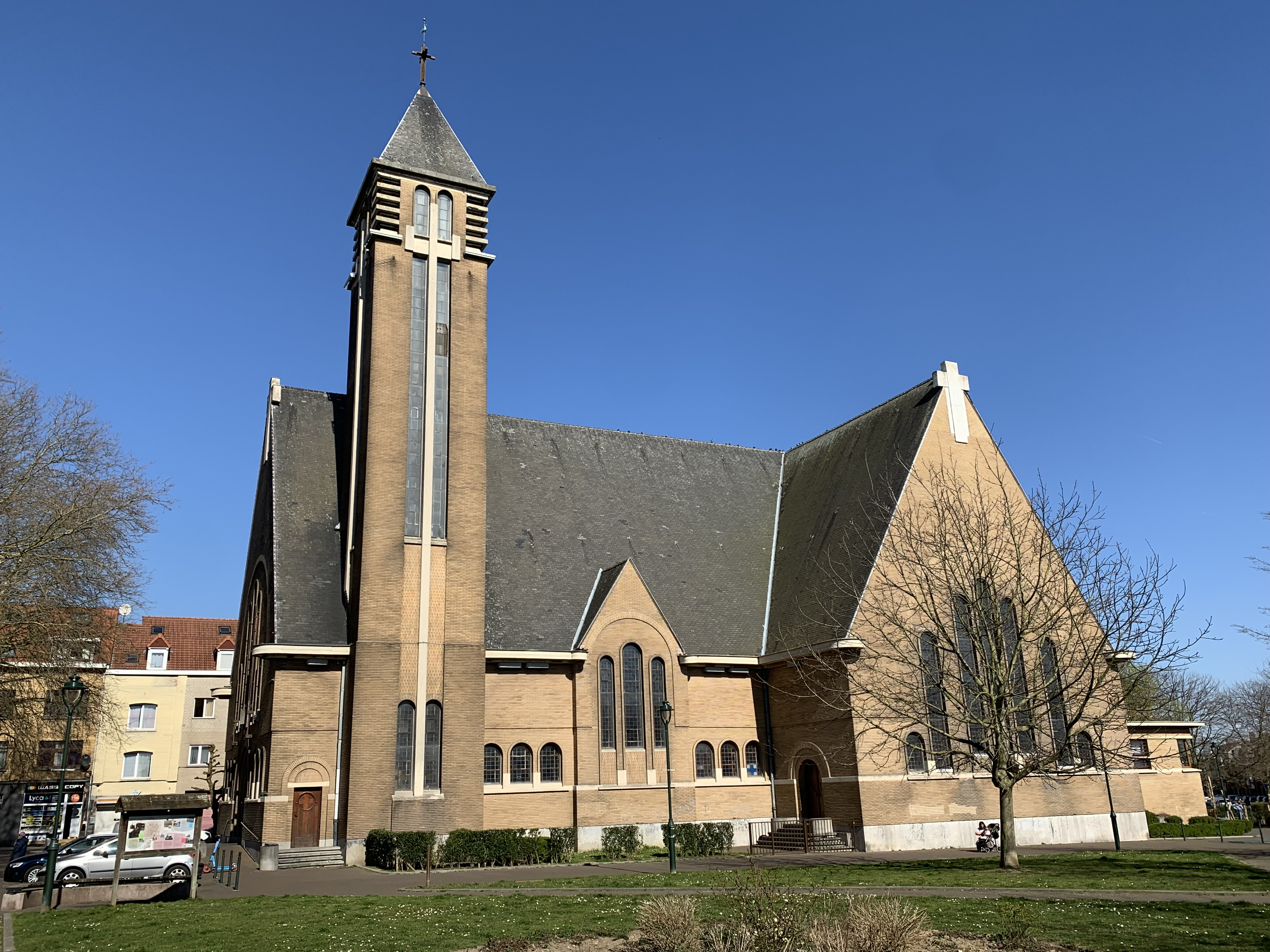
Church of St. Joseph

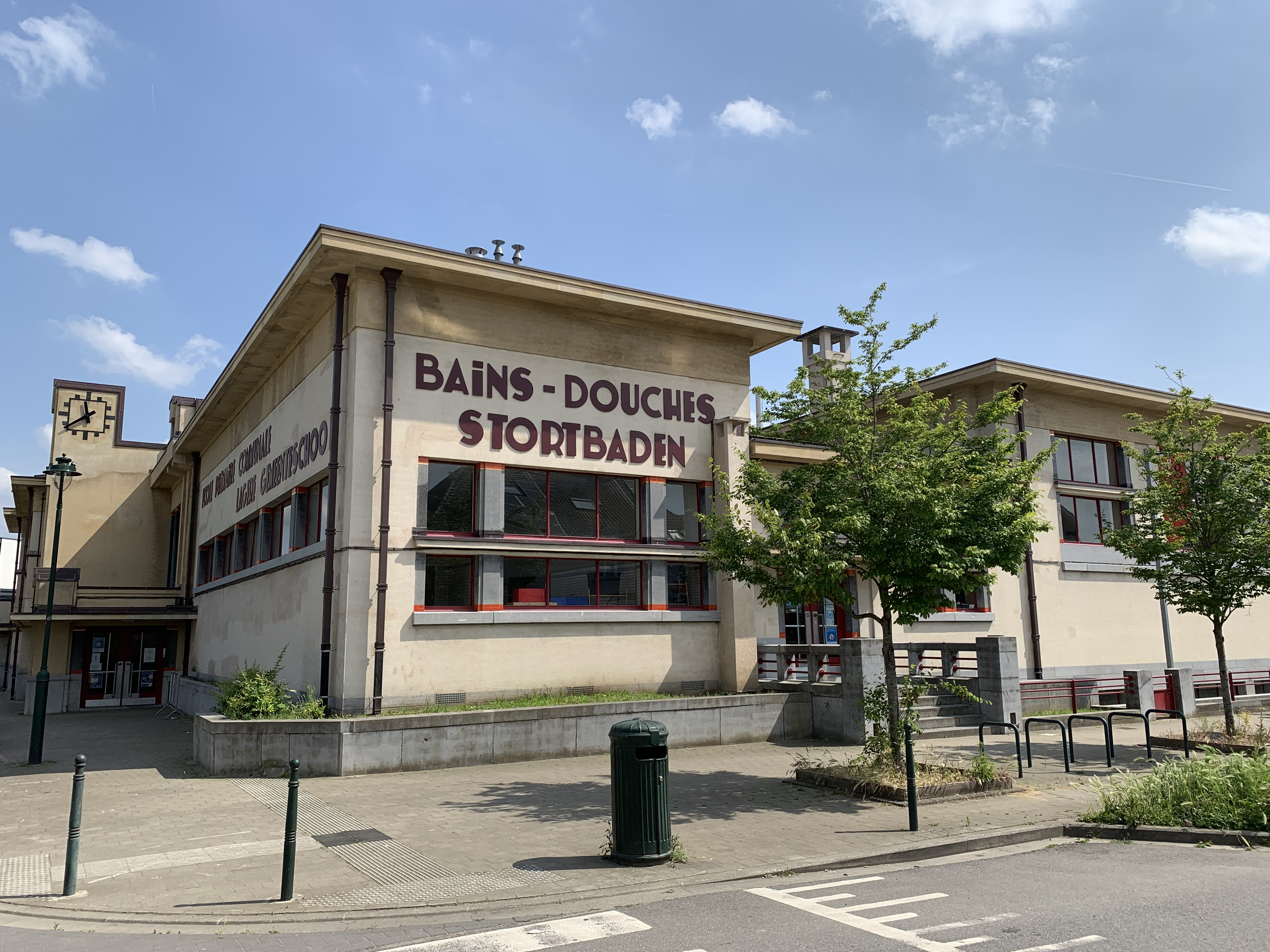
Municipal School no. 21

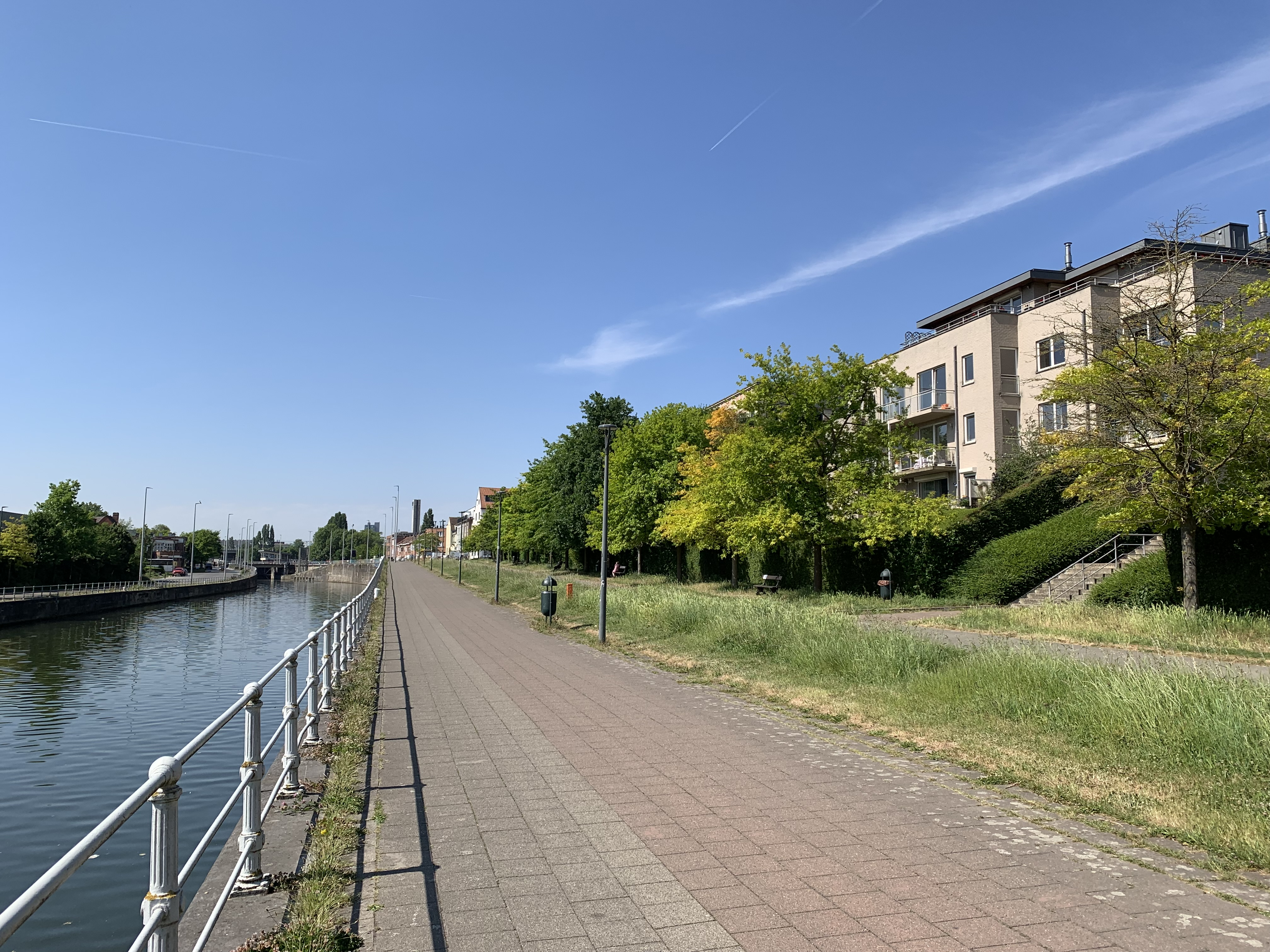
View along the canal in La Roue

==== Scheut ====
Located in the north of Anderlecht, Scheut is bounded by the border with the municipality of Molenbeek-Saint-Jean to the north, the historical centre of Anderlecht to the south, the Birmingham district to the east, the Scheutveld district to the west and the semi-natural site of the Scheutbos to the north-west. Historically, the Scheut Plateau held strategic importance and later evolved into a largely residential and commercial zone. It is in this district, on the Chaussée de Ninove/Ninoofsesteenweg, that lay the foundations of the Scheutveld College, on 28 April 1863, by the Catholic priest Theophile Verbist. The congregation of Scheut Missionaries went on to evangelise China, Mongolia, the Philippines, as well as the Congo Free State/Belgian Congo (modern-day Democratic Republic of the Congo).

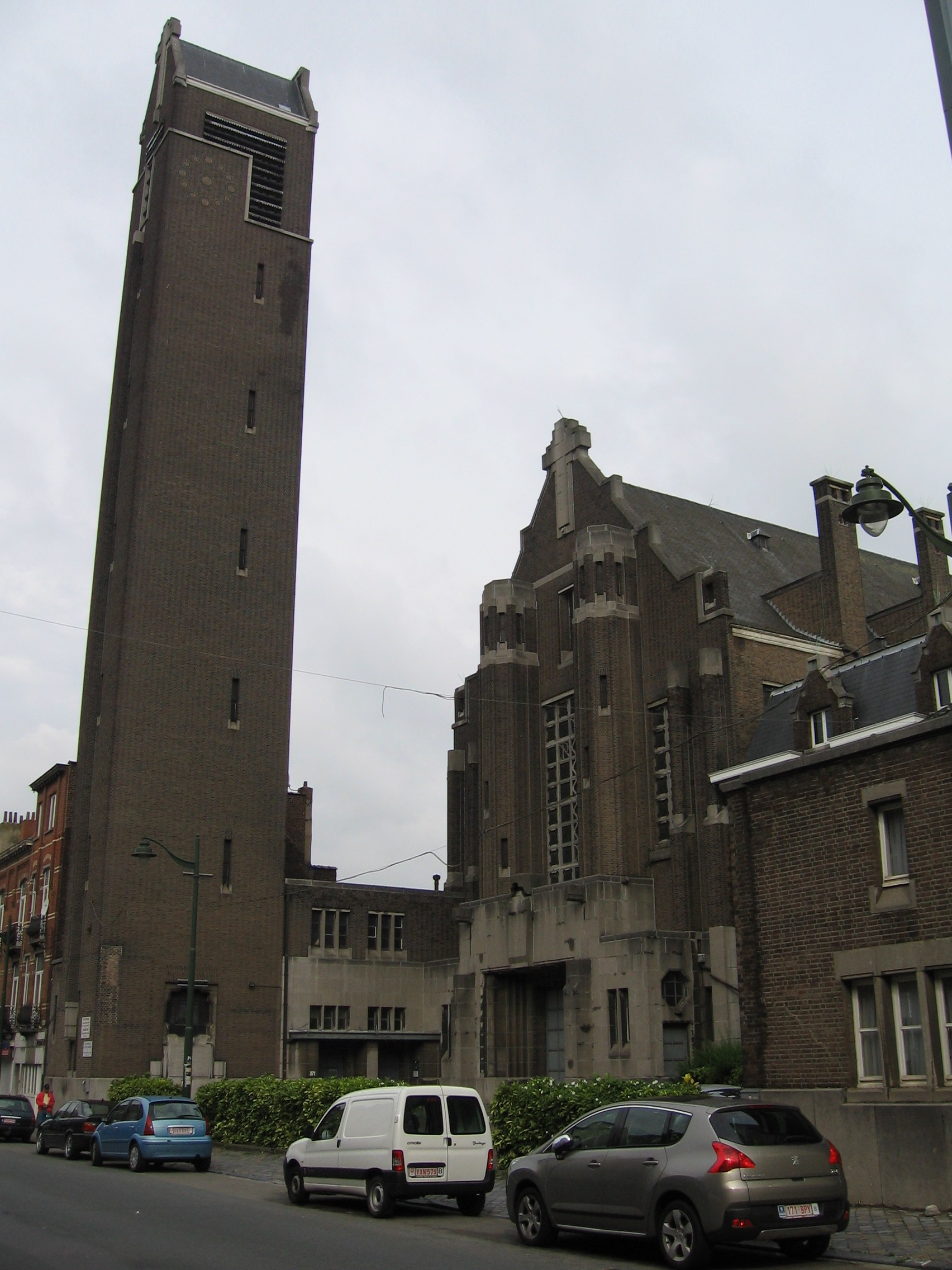
Church of St. Vincent de Paul

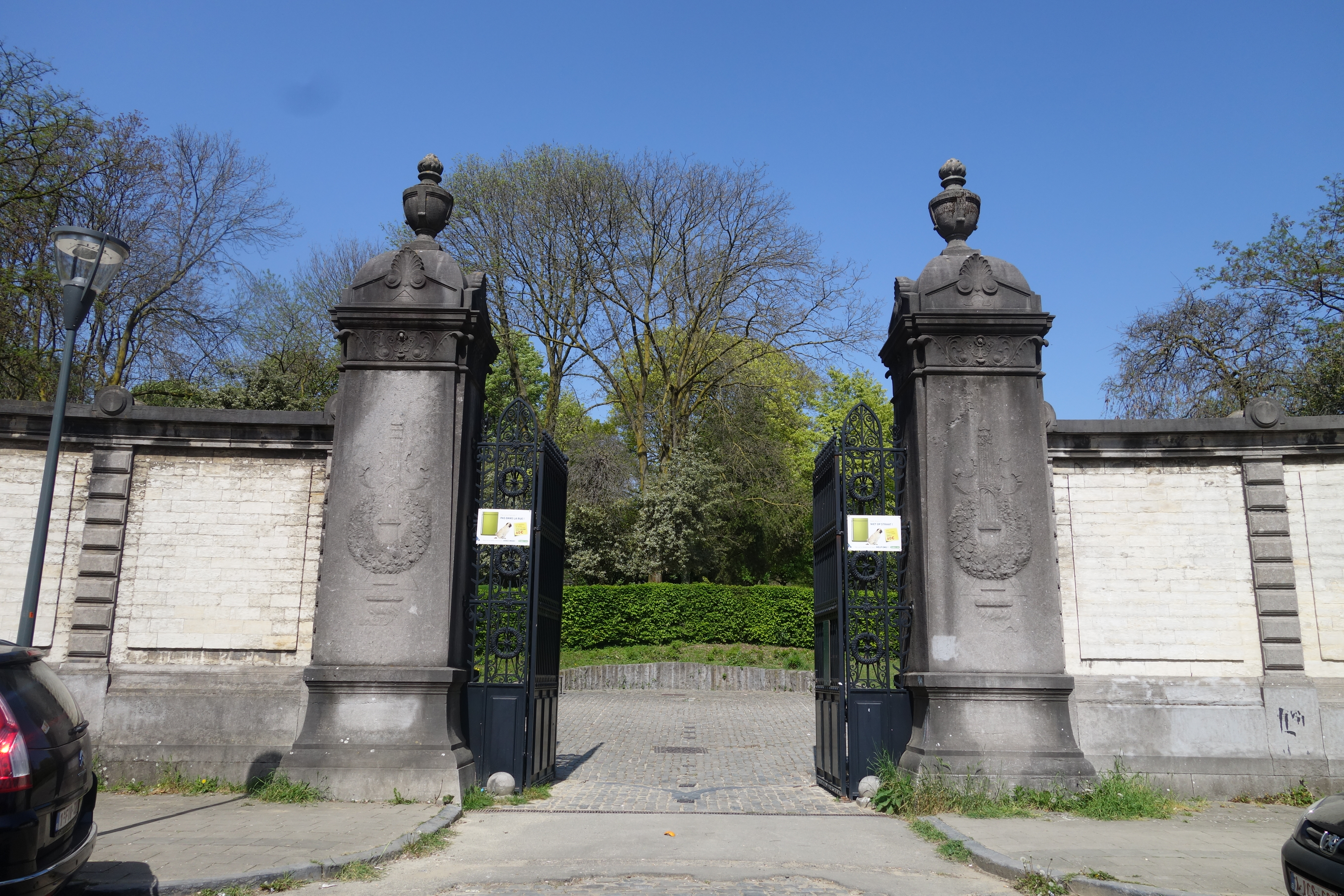
Parc Forestier/Bospark

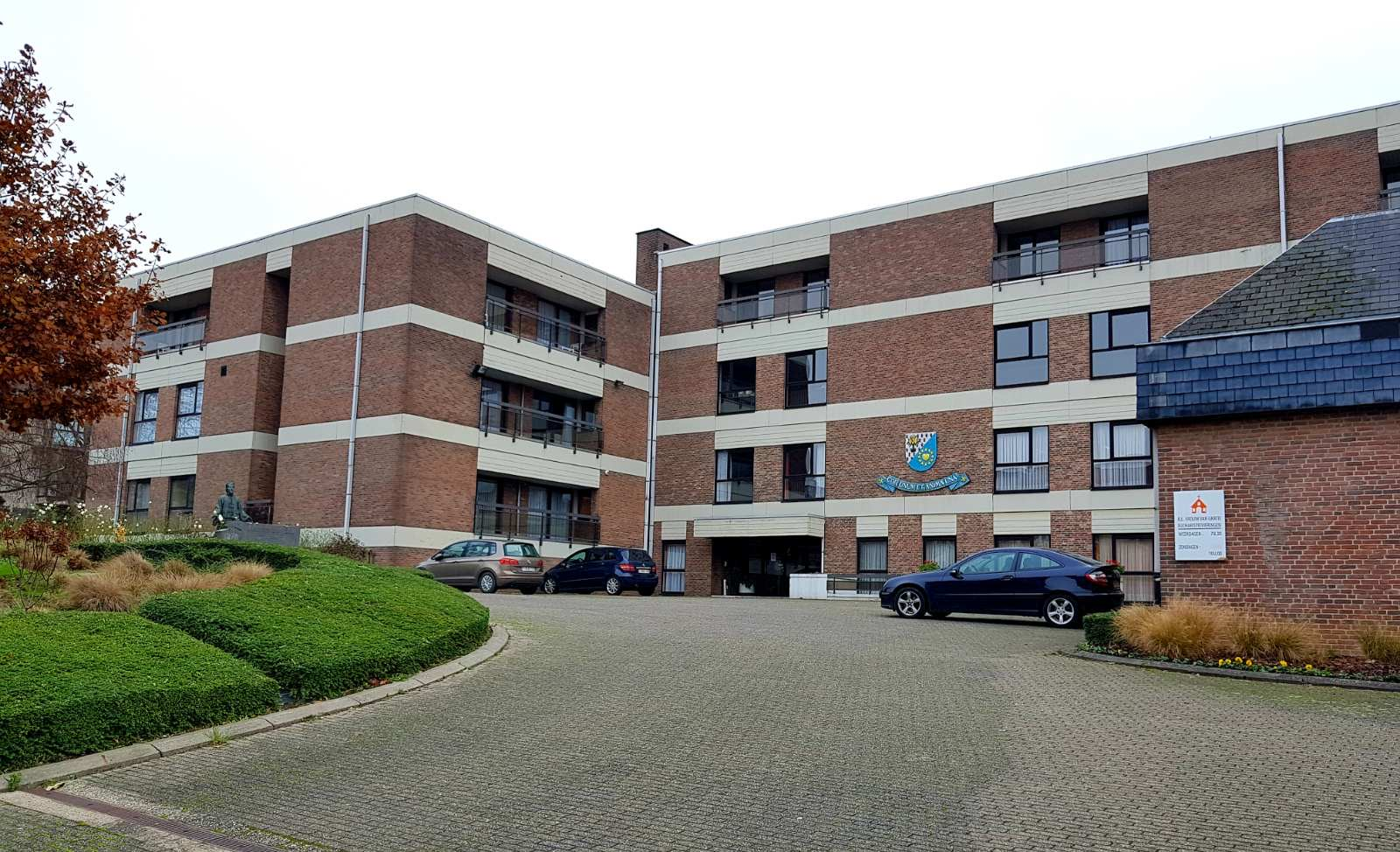
Scheut House of the CICM Missionaries

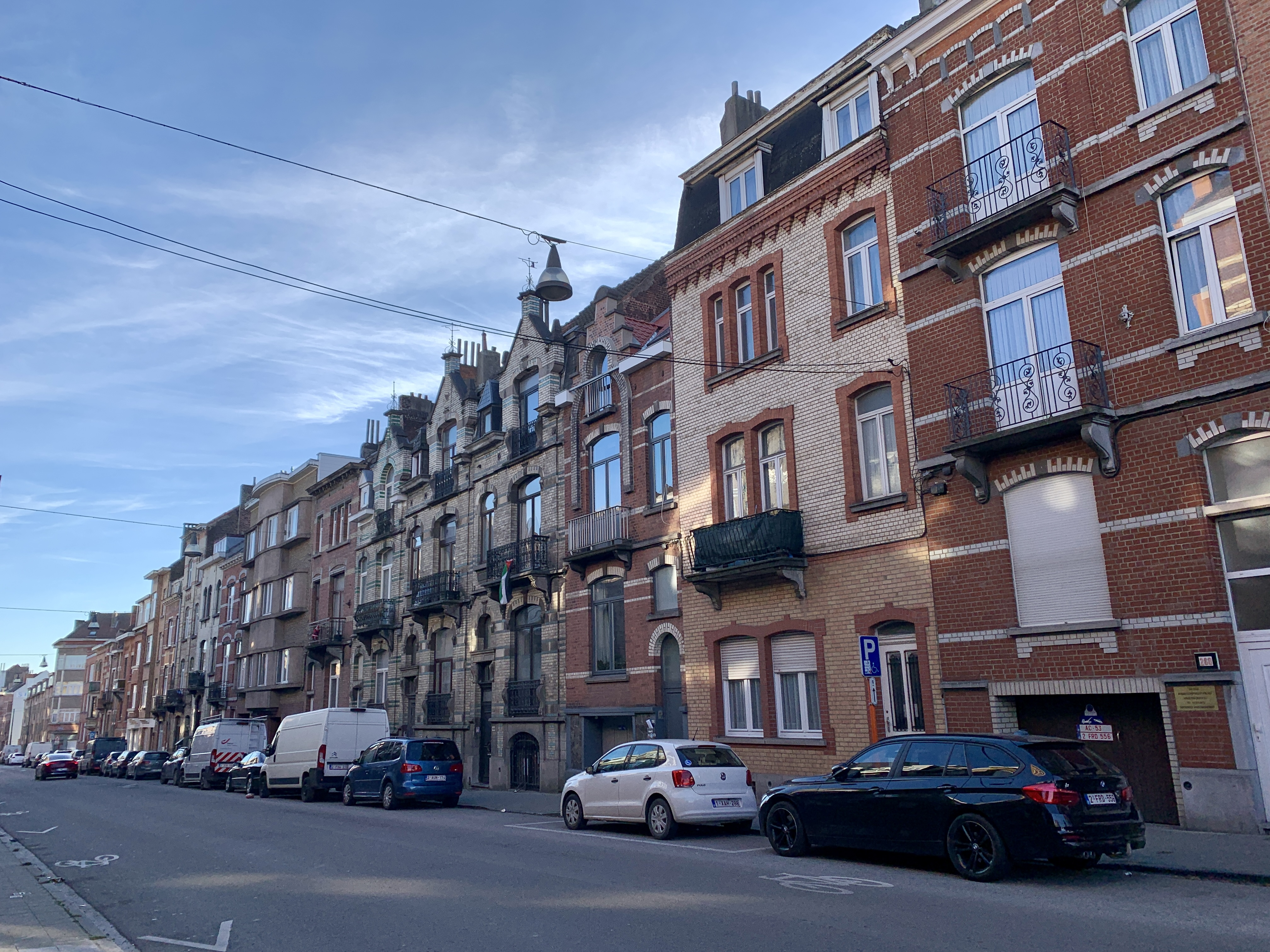
Avenue de Scheut/Scheutlaan

==== Scheutveld (Prince of Liège) ====
Located in the north of Anderlecht, Scheutveld, also known as the Prince of Liège district, is a quiet, residential neighbourhood centred around Scheutveld Park and the Rue du Potaerdenberg/Potaardenbergstraat. It is bounded by the Boulevard Maria Groeninckx-De May/Maria Groeninckx-De Maylaan to the west and the Boulevard Prince de Liège/Prins van Luiklaan to the east. The district features a mix of mid-20th-century housing, including low-rise apartment buildings and villas, set around generous public space, making it one of the municipality's greener suburban-style neighbourhoods. It also benefits from a direct pedestrian and cycle link via a footbridge to the adjacent Peterbos district.

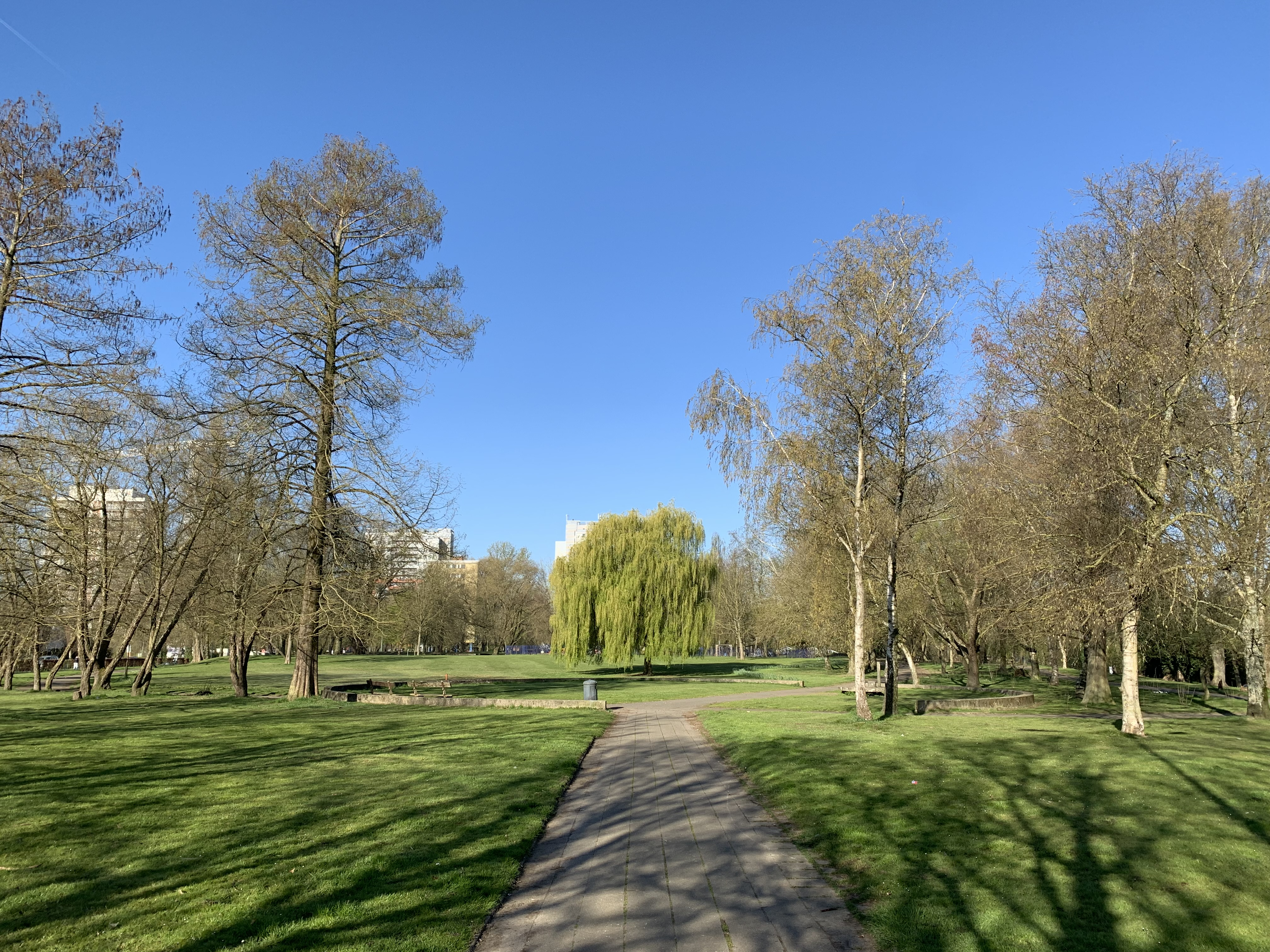
Scheutveld Park

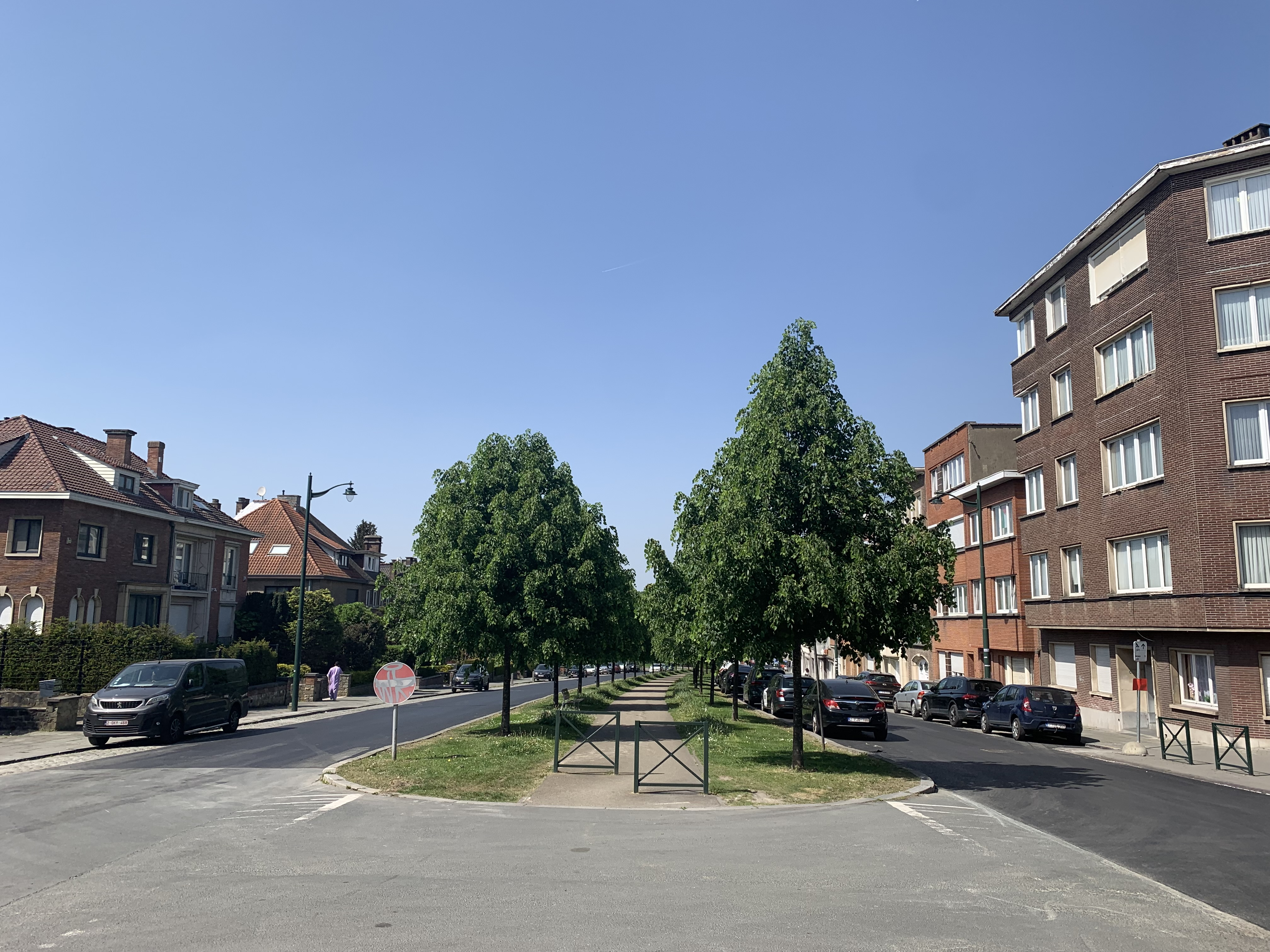
Boulevard Prince de Liège/Prins van Luiklaan

==== Peterbos ====
Located in the north of Anderlecht, near the municipality's highest point, this district includes one of the largest social housing estates in the Brussels Region. Spanning 17.1 ha (42 acres), the site comprises a series of tower blocks. It is an open-plan urban development where none of the buildings face the street nor are aligned, with visual clearances between them. Despite the high concentration of social housing, the neighbourhood has many green spaces, particularly within Peterbos Park.

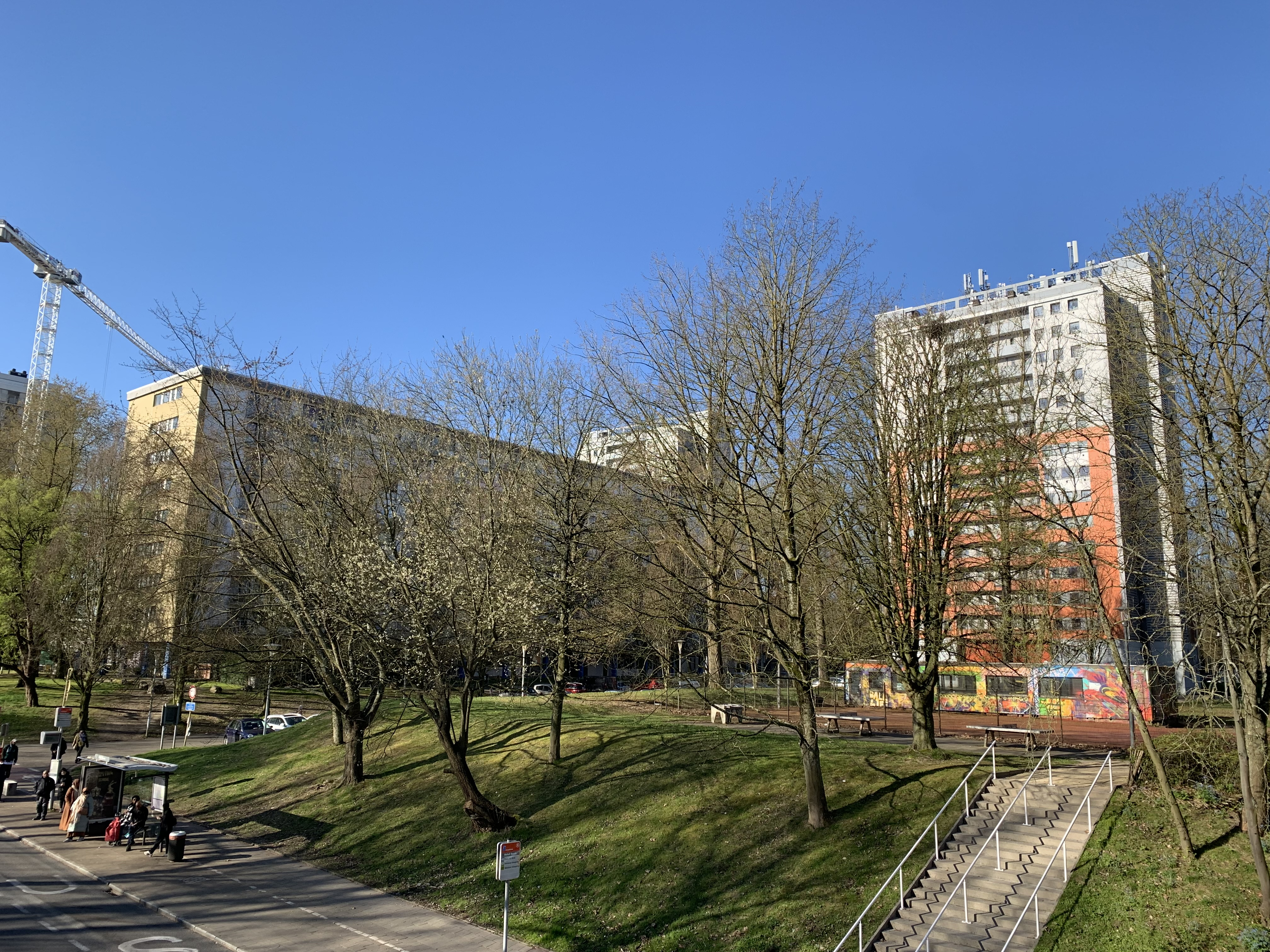
Peterbos housing estate

==== Moortebeek ====
Located in the north-west of Anderlecht and extending slightly into neighbouring Molenbeek-Saint-Jean, Moortebeek borders the Peterbos district. This architectural ensemble, crossed by the Boulevard Shakespeare/Shakespearelaan, is representative of the 20th-century garden city movement. For a time, the district was dubbed the Little Moscow (French: le petit Moscou, Dutch: het Klein Moskou), in reference to the political context in which it was created. It is now a pleasant neighbourhood that has retained its character and cohesion.

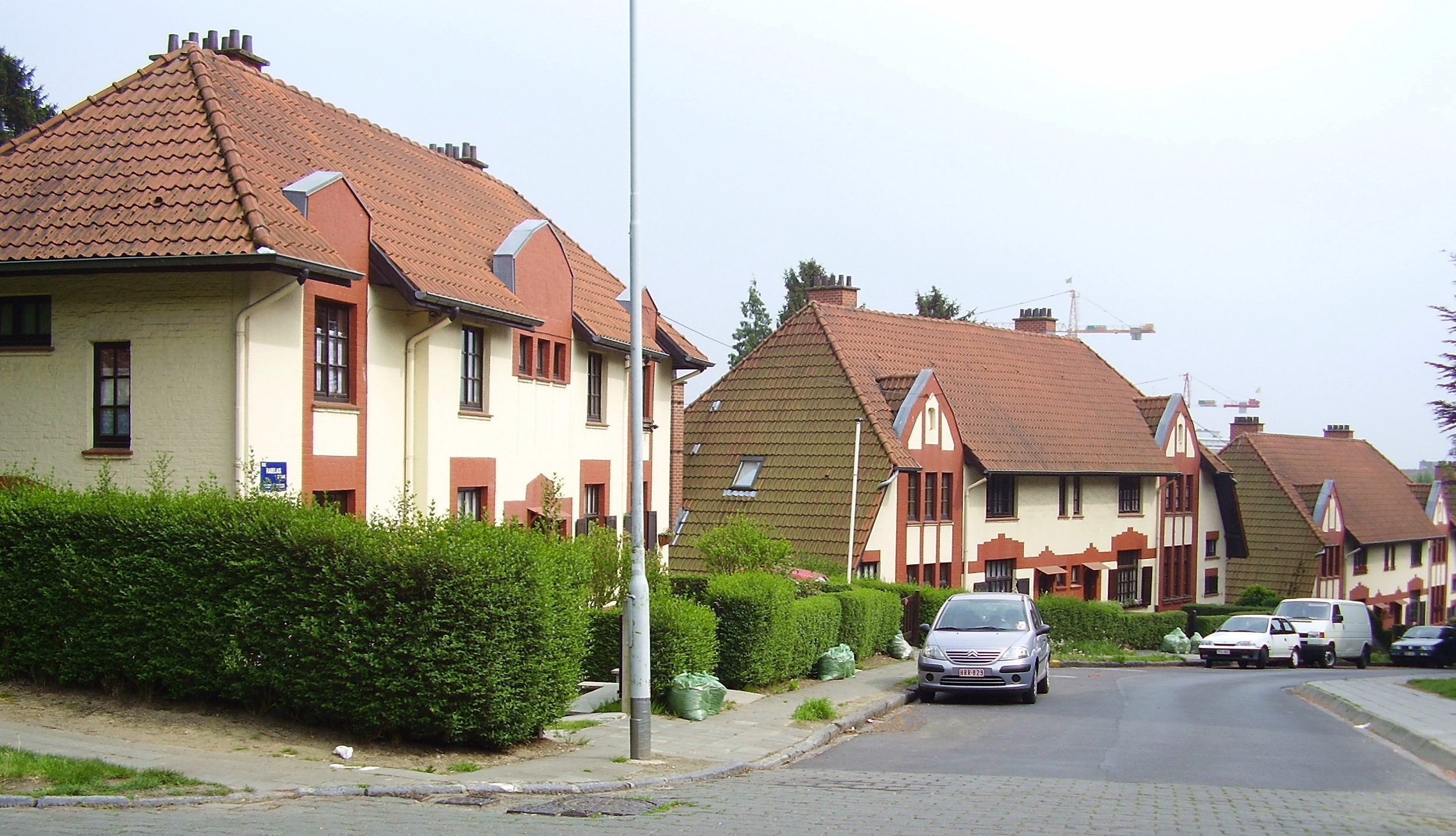
Moortebeek garden city

==== Scherdemael/Scherdemaal ====
Located in the centre-west of Anderlecht, this relatively quiet district, bisected by Scherdemael Park, is bounded by the Avenue d'Itterbeek/Itterbeekse Laan to the north, the Rue de Neerpede/Neerpedestraat to the south and the Boulevard Joseph Bracops/Joseph Bracopslaan to the west. The neighbourhood takes its name from the Scherdemael Plateau, which extends further west beyond the boulevard, as indicated by the Rue de Scherdemael/Scherdemaalstraat, situated largely outside the Brussels Ring. Developed in the 1950s and 1960s according to the Park system urban planning principle, it forms a cohesive residential unit combining apartment buildings, single-family villas and service buildings, all arranged around this green space containing a primary school, playgrounds and sports fields.

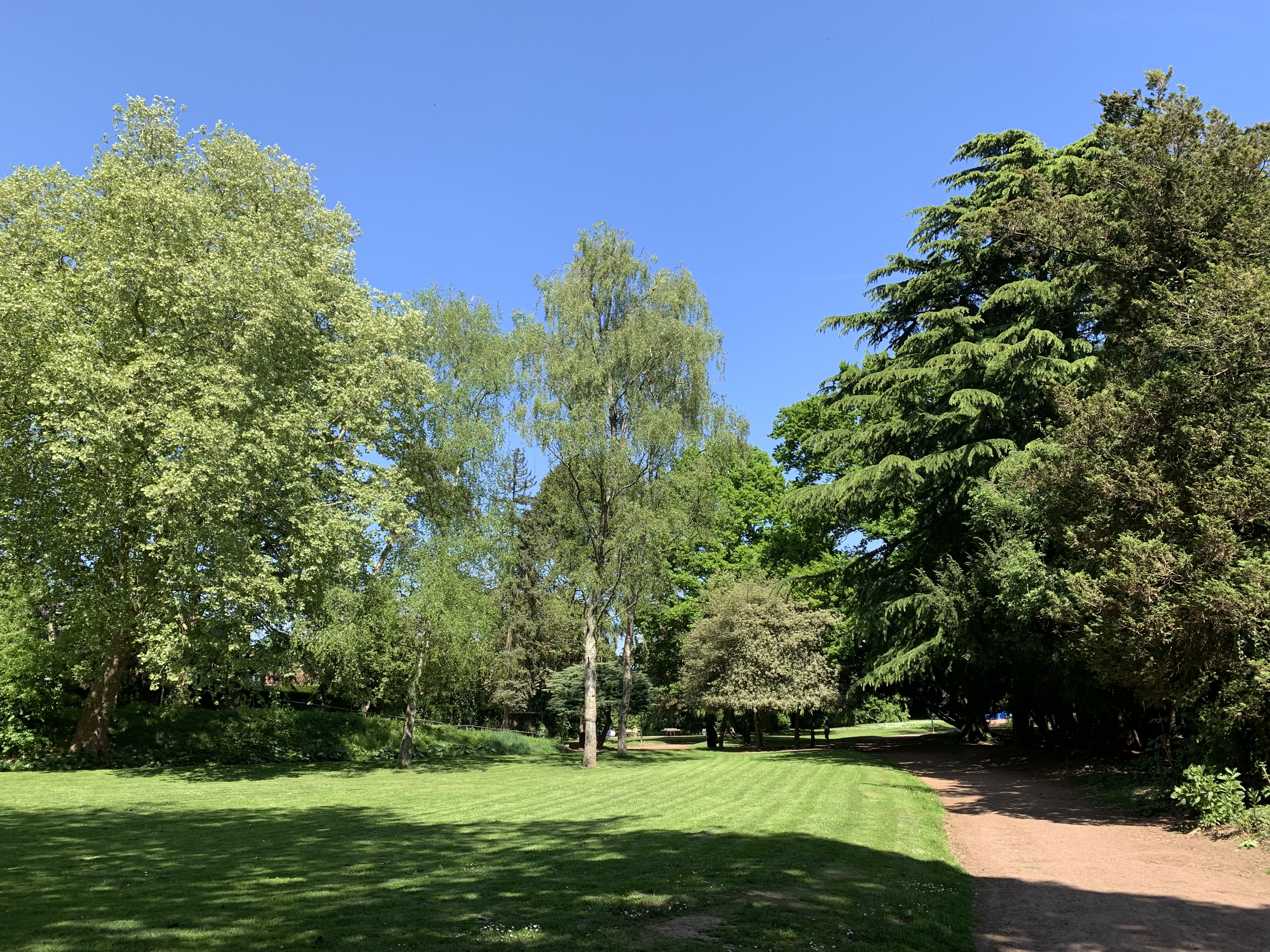
Scherdemael Park

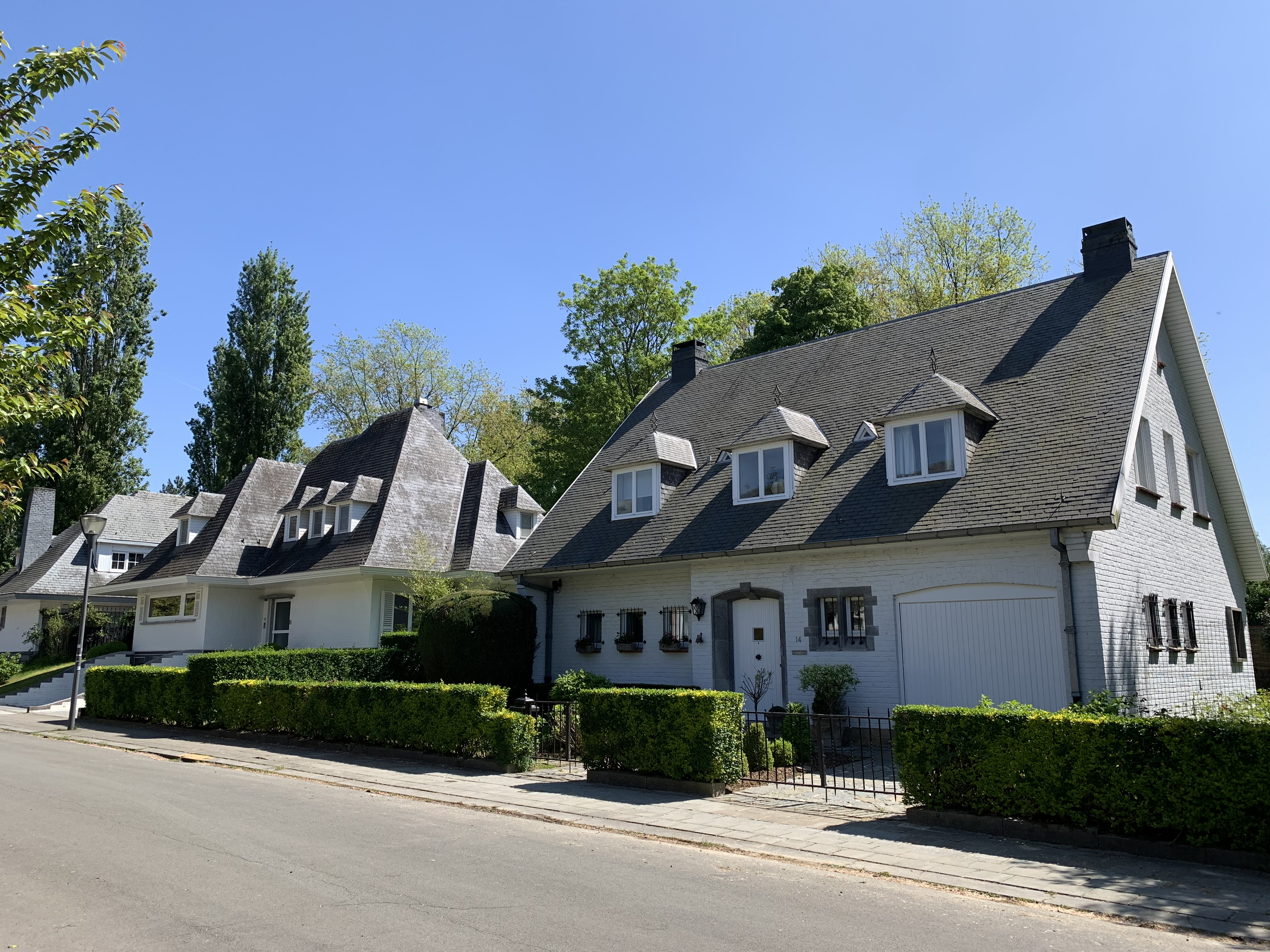
Avenue Chanoine Roose/Kanunnik Rooselaan

==== Bon Air/Goede Lucht ====
Located in the north-west of Anderlecht, Bon Air/Goede Lucht ("Good Air") is a small, tranquil and modest district recognised as one of the garden cities of the Brussels Region. Centred on the Place Séverine/Séverineplein and surrounded by small streets in a semi-rural style, it is bounded to the south by a section of the Avenue d'Itterbeek and to the north by the Broekbeek stream, which at this point forms the boundary between Anderlecht and the Flemish municipality of Dilbeek.

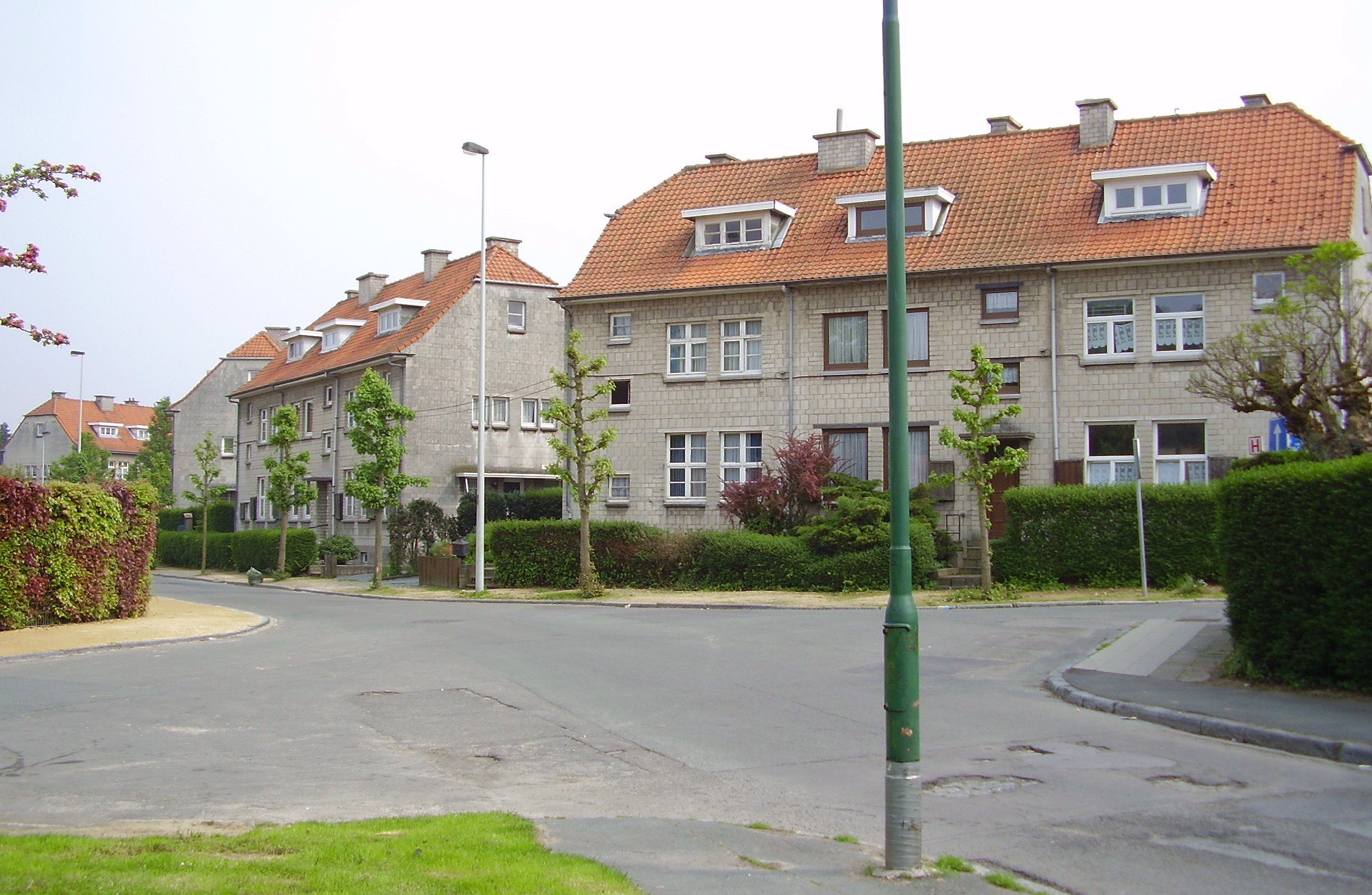
Bon Air/Goede Lucht garden city

==== Ponds Quarter ====
The Ponds Quarter (French: Quartier des Étangs, Dutch: Vijverswijk) is located in the south of Anderlecht. This district's name refers to the ponds in the Parc des Étangs/Vijverspark, situated between the Avenue Marius Renard/Marius Renardlaan and the Boulevard Maurice Carême/Maurice Carêmelaan. The neighbourhood urbanised in the 1960s and 1970s on land that was then agricultural. It closely blends green spaces, tall apartment buildings, commercial and educational facilities, as well as single-family housing, and is thus representative of the Park system.

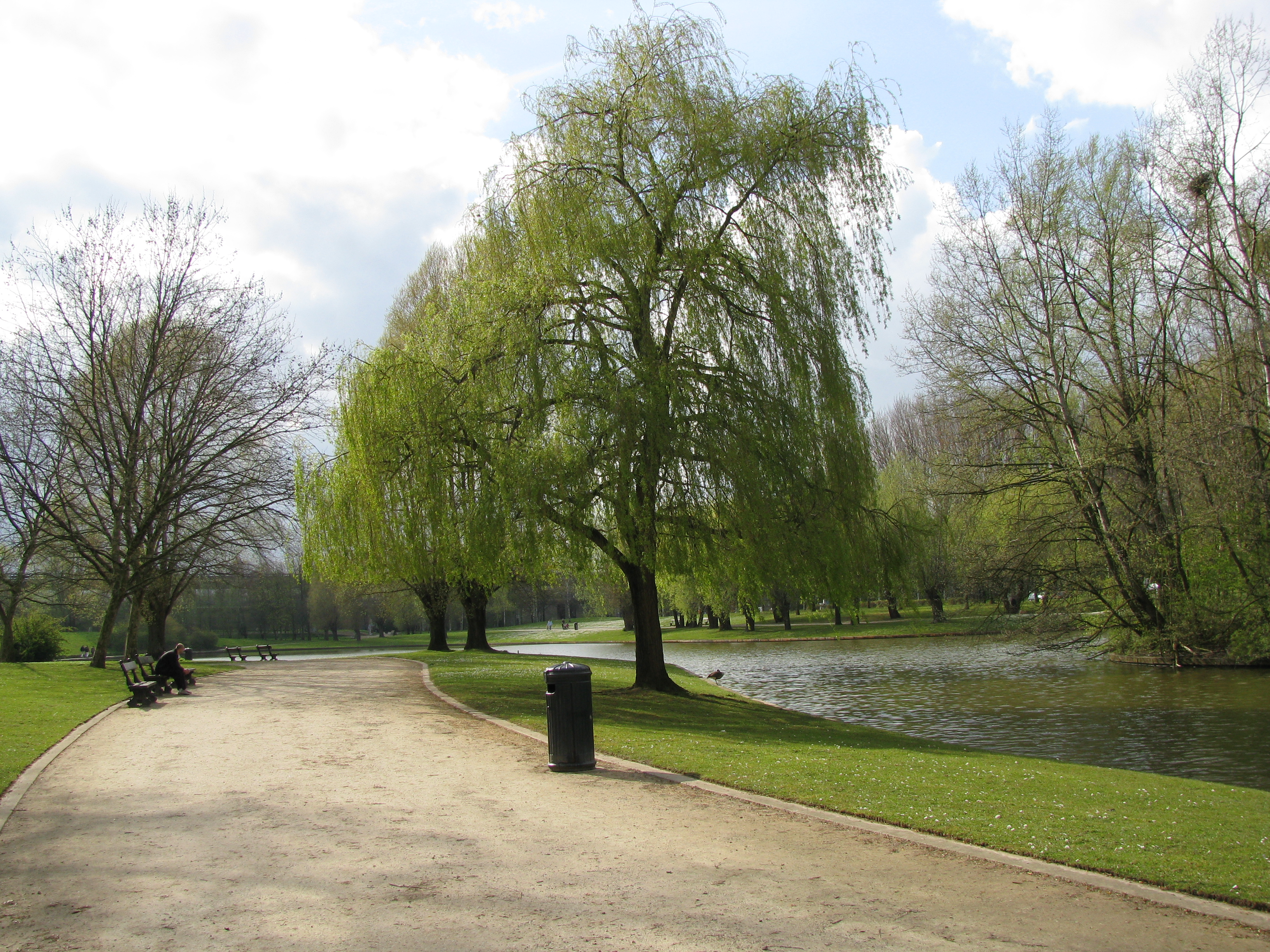
Parc des Étangs/Vijverspark

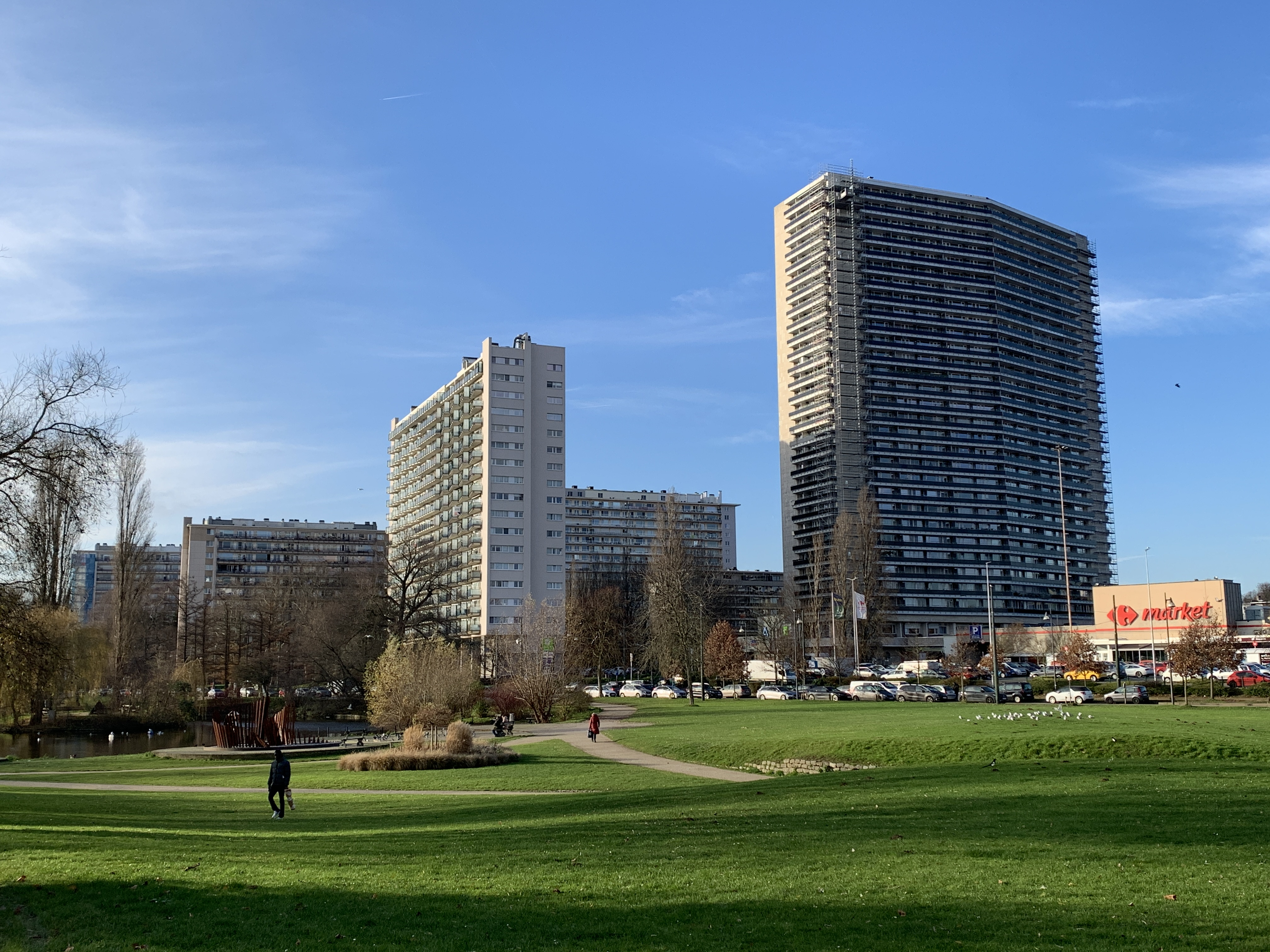
Marius Renard housing estate

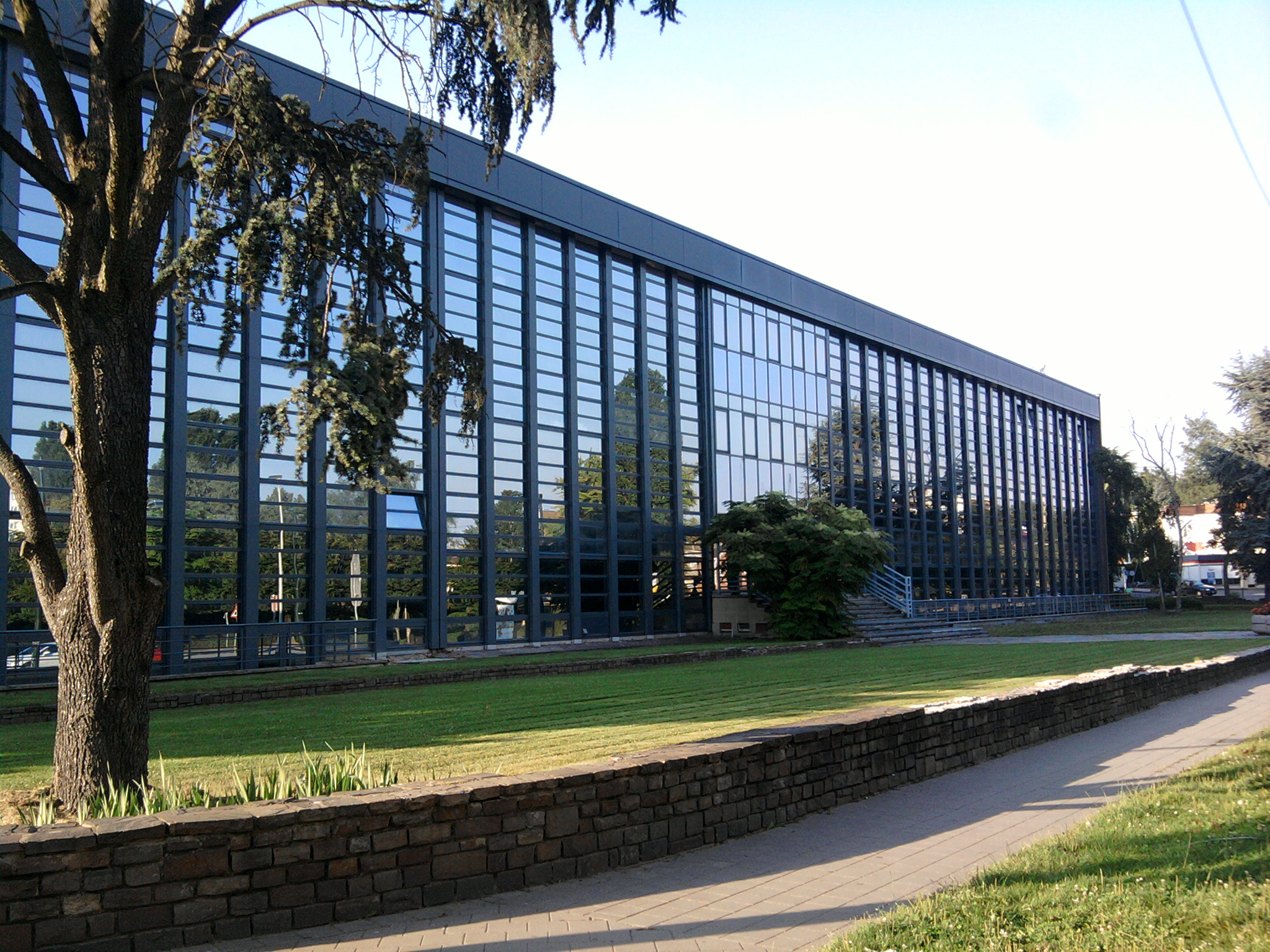
Redouté-Peiffer Institute

==== Trèfles/Klavers ====
This district lies in the south of Anderlecht, between La Roue and the Ponds Quarter. Bounded by the Chaussée de Mons, the Boulevard Maurice Carême and the railroad, it has the particularity of being made up of terraced houses to the north and rapidly developing land to the south. The Rue des Trèfles/Klaverstraat, which gave it its name, runs through the neighbourhood. Along the Rue Delwart/Delwartstraat, the Trèfles nursery and primary school (Municipal School no. 23), with its cloverleaf layout, reflects a broader effort to combine education with contemporary environmental standards.

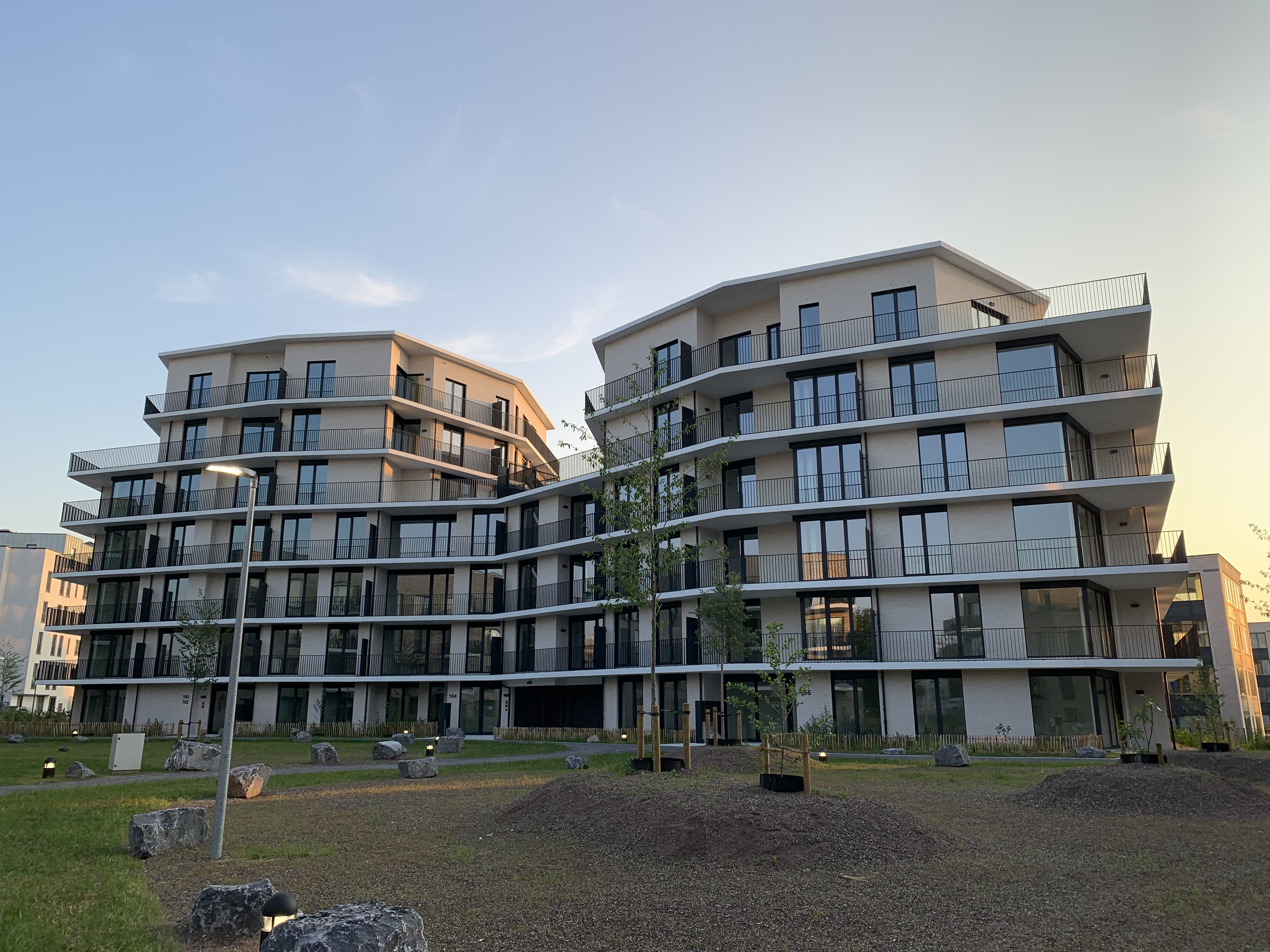
Clos des Trèfles/Klavershoek

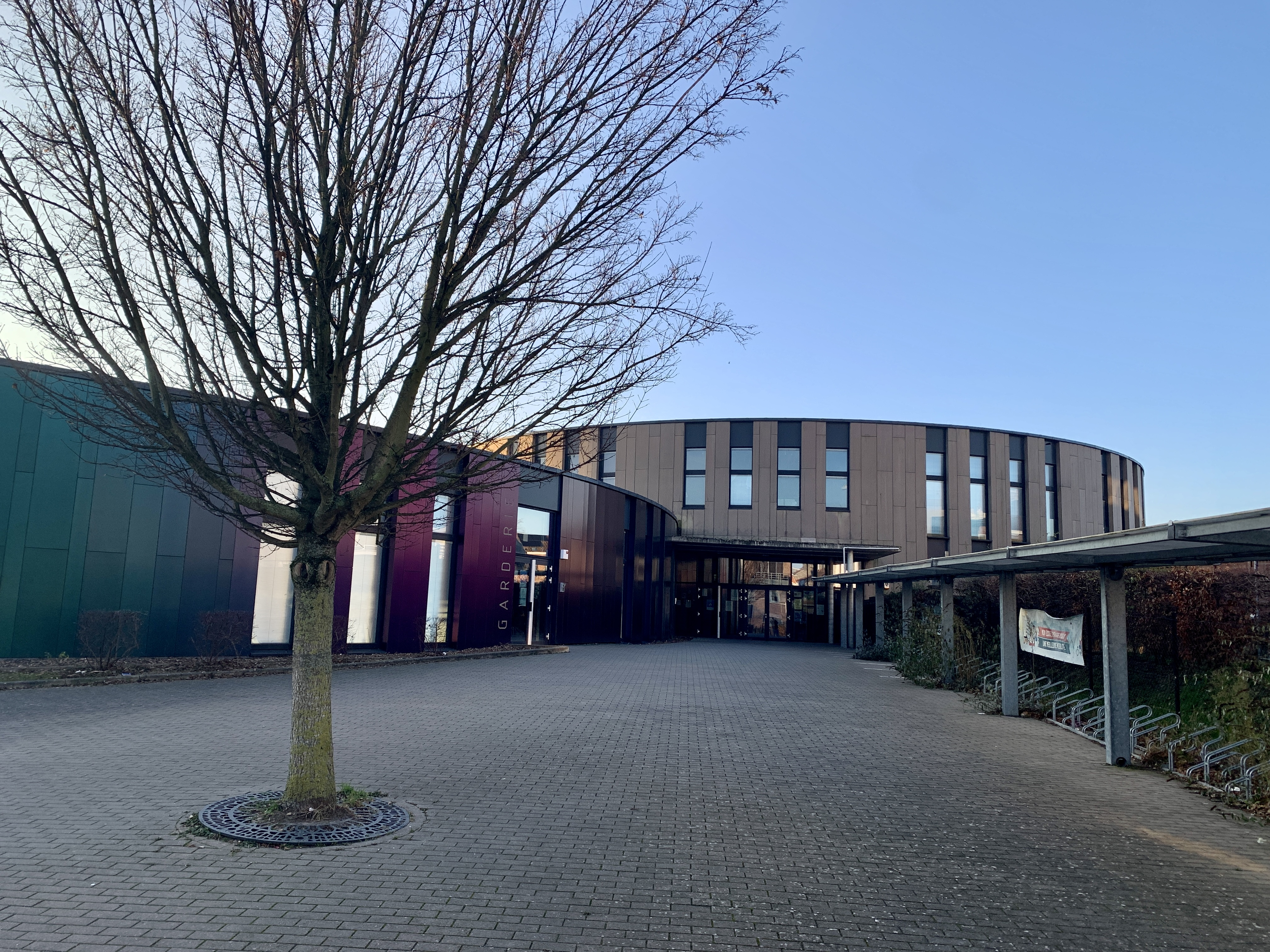
Municipal School no. 23

==== Neerpede ====
Located in the south-west of Anderlecht, Neerpede lies on the western edge of the Brussels agglomeration, just beyond the Brussels Ring, on the border with the Pajottenland. The area is situated along the Neerpedebeek stream, downstream from Sint-Anna-Pede and Sint-Gertrudis-Pede in Flemish Brabant. Ecclesiastically and administratively, the hamlet has always depended on Anderlecht. Today, it is one of the few parts of Brussels that has remained primarily rural and Dutch-speaking. Since 2018, the district has included two nature reserves (the Koeivijverdal and the Neerpede reedbed). It also houses sporting facilities, notably the training complex, the youth department, and large parts of the administrative departments of R.S.C. Anderlecht.

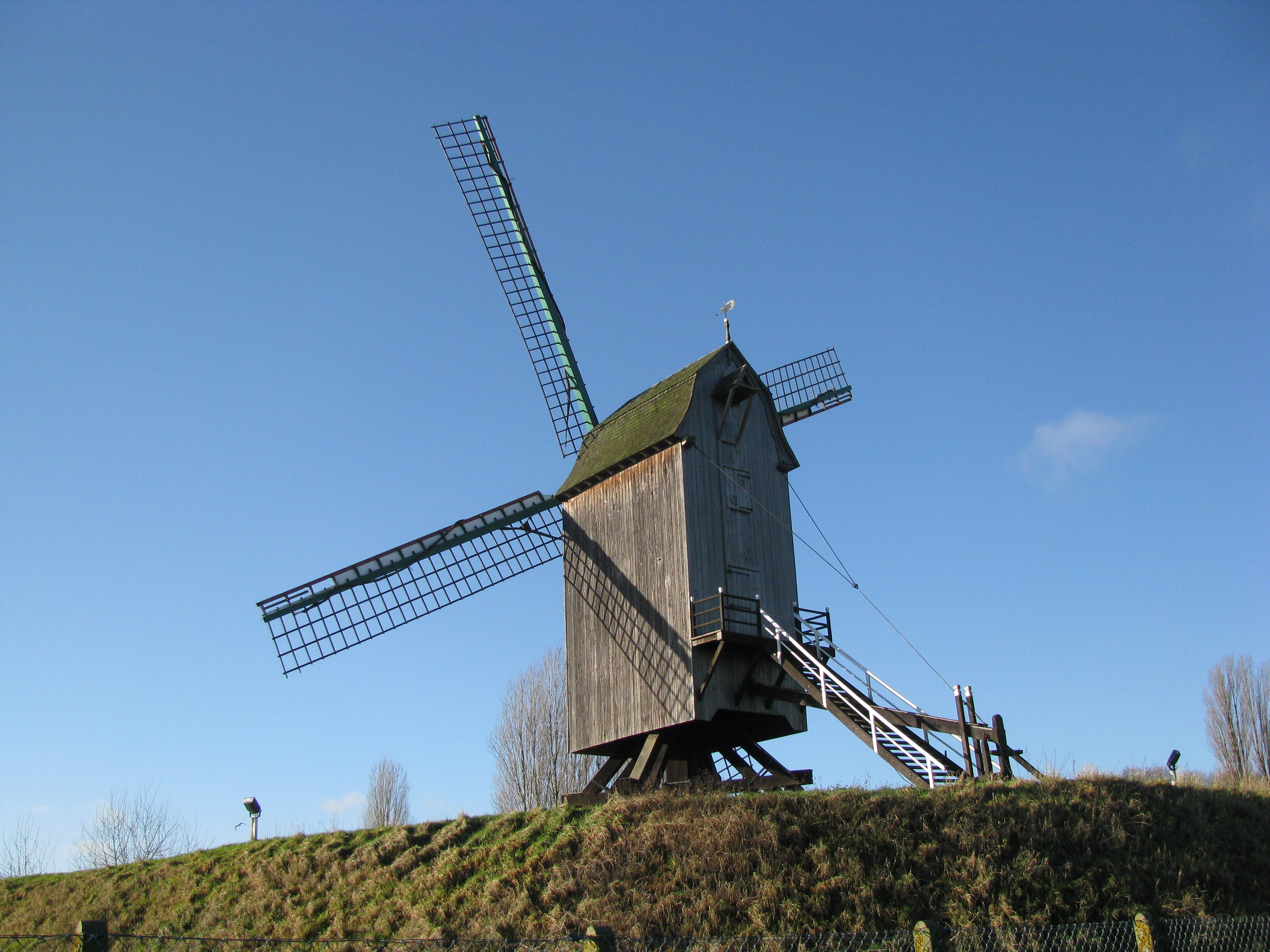
Luizenmolen

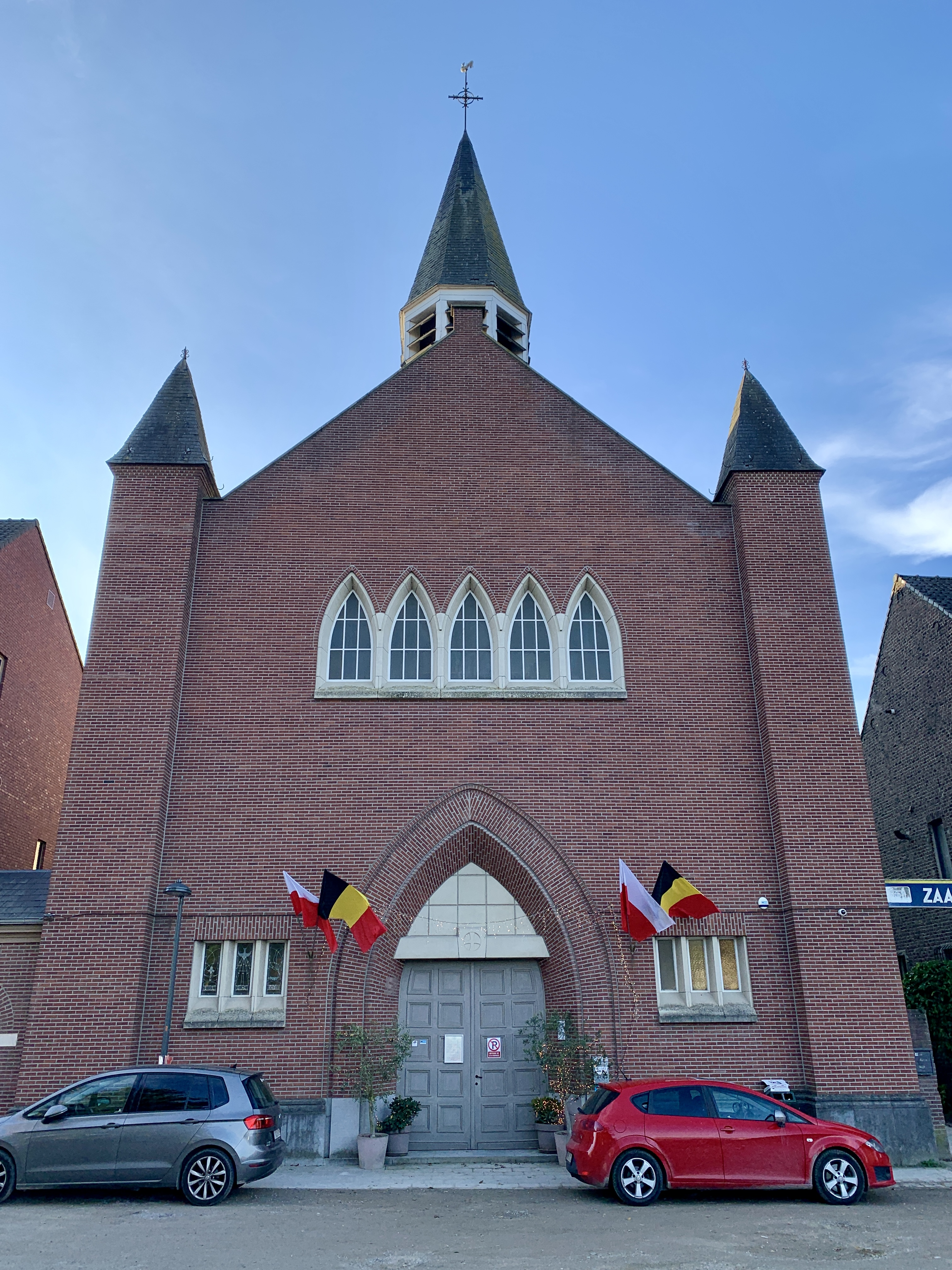
Church of St. Gerard Majella

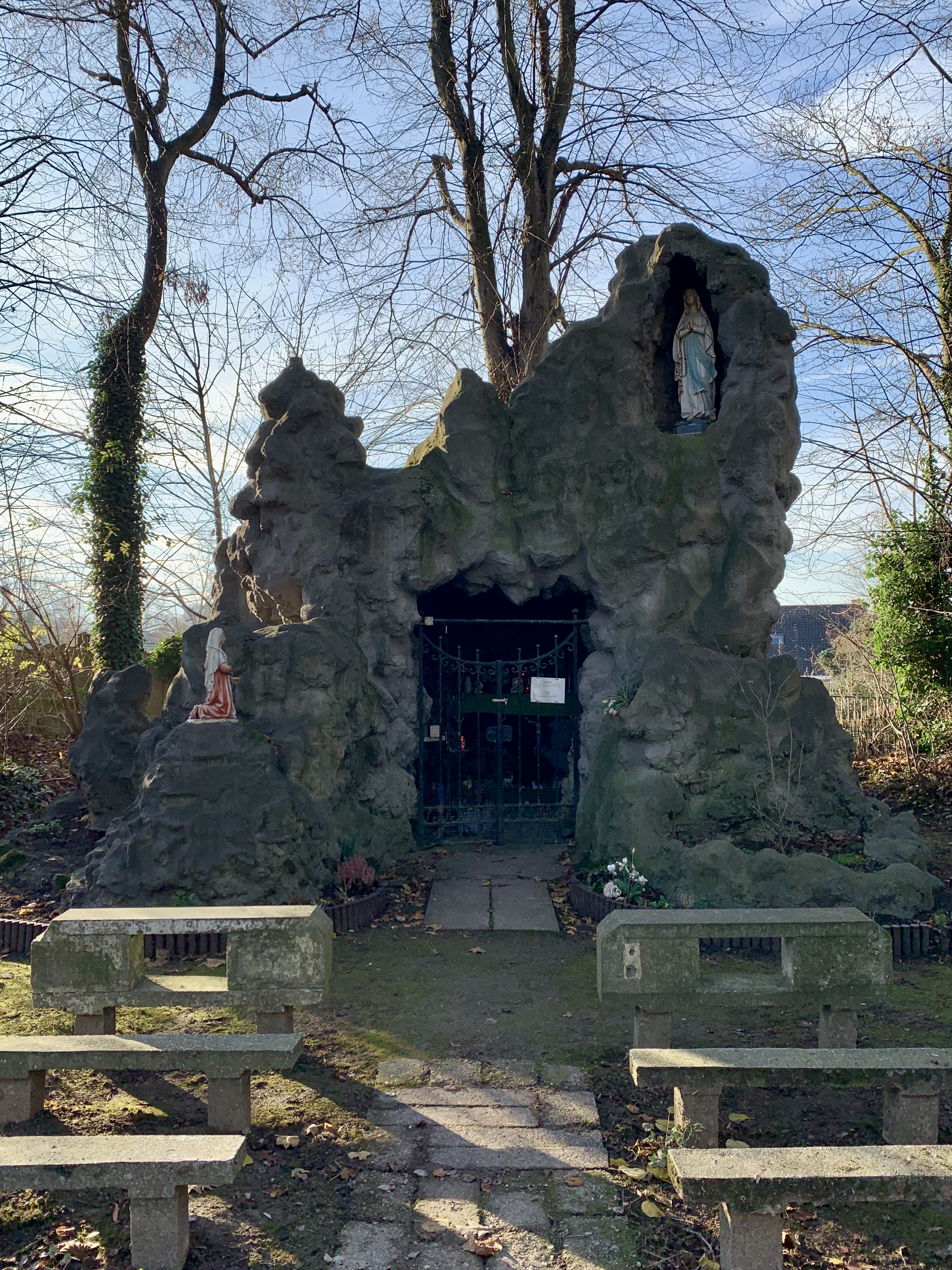
Our Lady of Lourdes Grotto

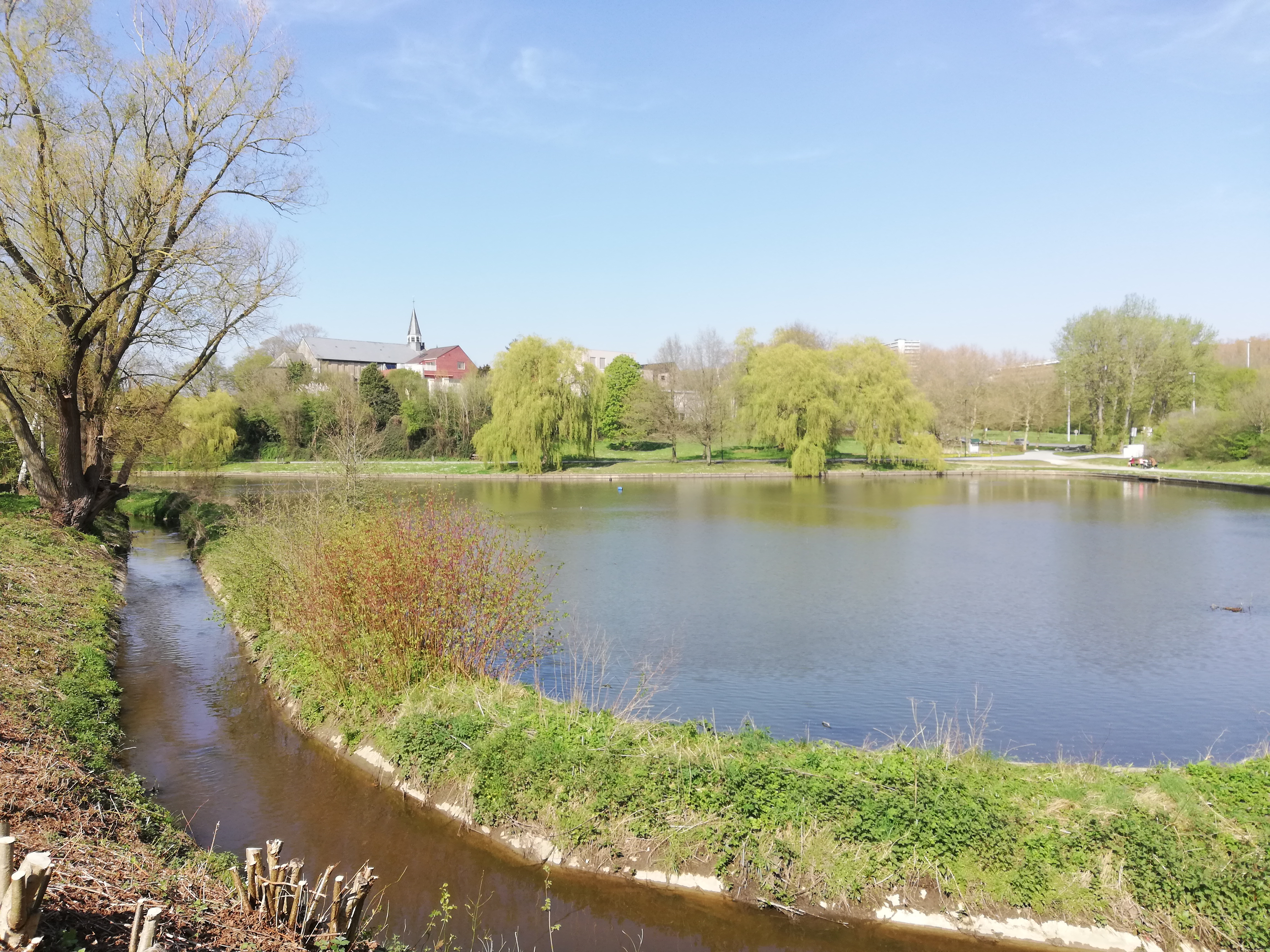
Neerpedebeek and Neerpede Ponds

==== Vogelenzang ====
Located in the south of Anderlecht, Vogelenzang (also spelled Vogelzang) is home to the Erasme/Erasmus campus of the Université libre de Bruxelles (ULB) and Erasmus Hospital. The area's name, literally "birds' song", comes from the Vogelzangbeek stream, a tributary of the Senne that marks the boundary between Brussels and Sint-Pieters-Leeuw. The neighbourhood consists of two parts: the first, traversed by the Boulevard Josse Leemans/Josse Leemanslaan, surrounds Anderlecht Cemetery (also known as Vogelenzang Cemetery) and a residential district; the second, known as Meylemeersch/Mijlemeers, is a semi-rural zone crossed by the Route de Lennik/Lenniksebaan that is increasingly being developed as a regional business park. The Vogelzangbeek valley, however, remains a protected natural site and a popular place for walkers.

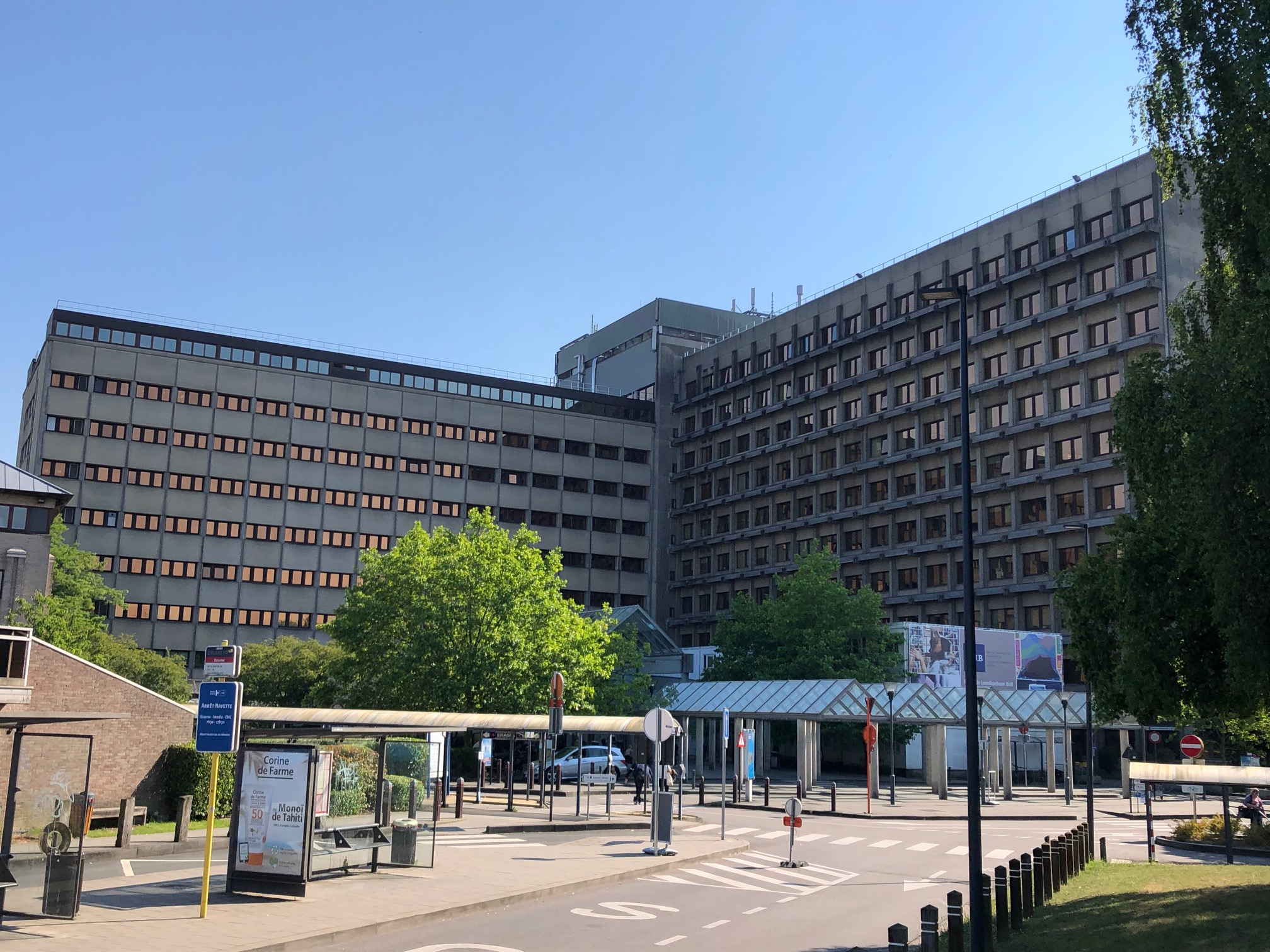
Erasmus Hospital

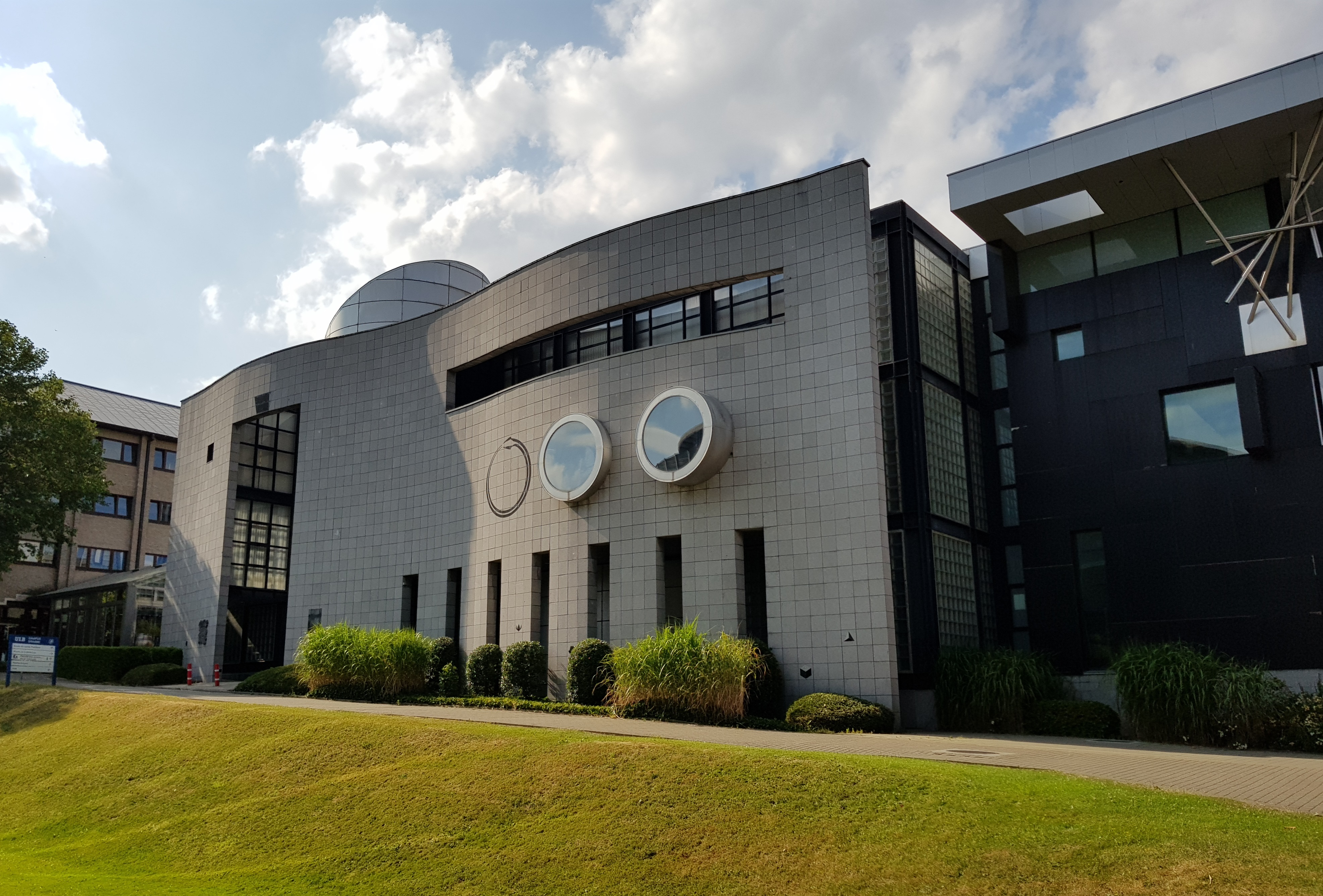
Museum of Medicine

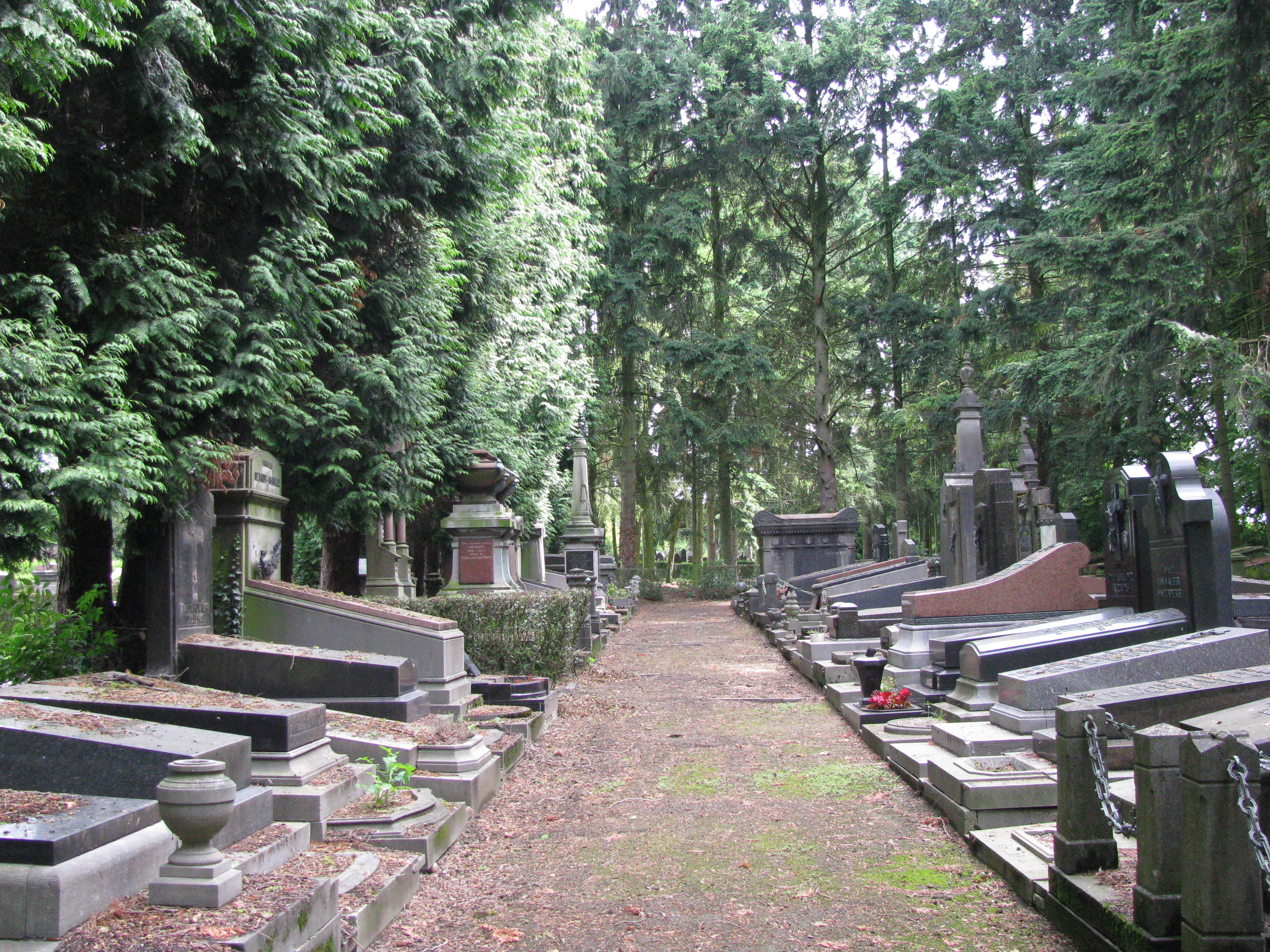
Anderlecht Cemetery

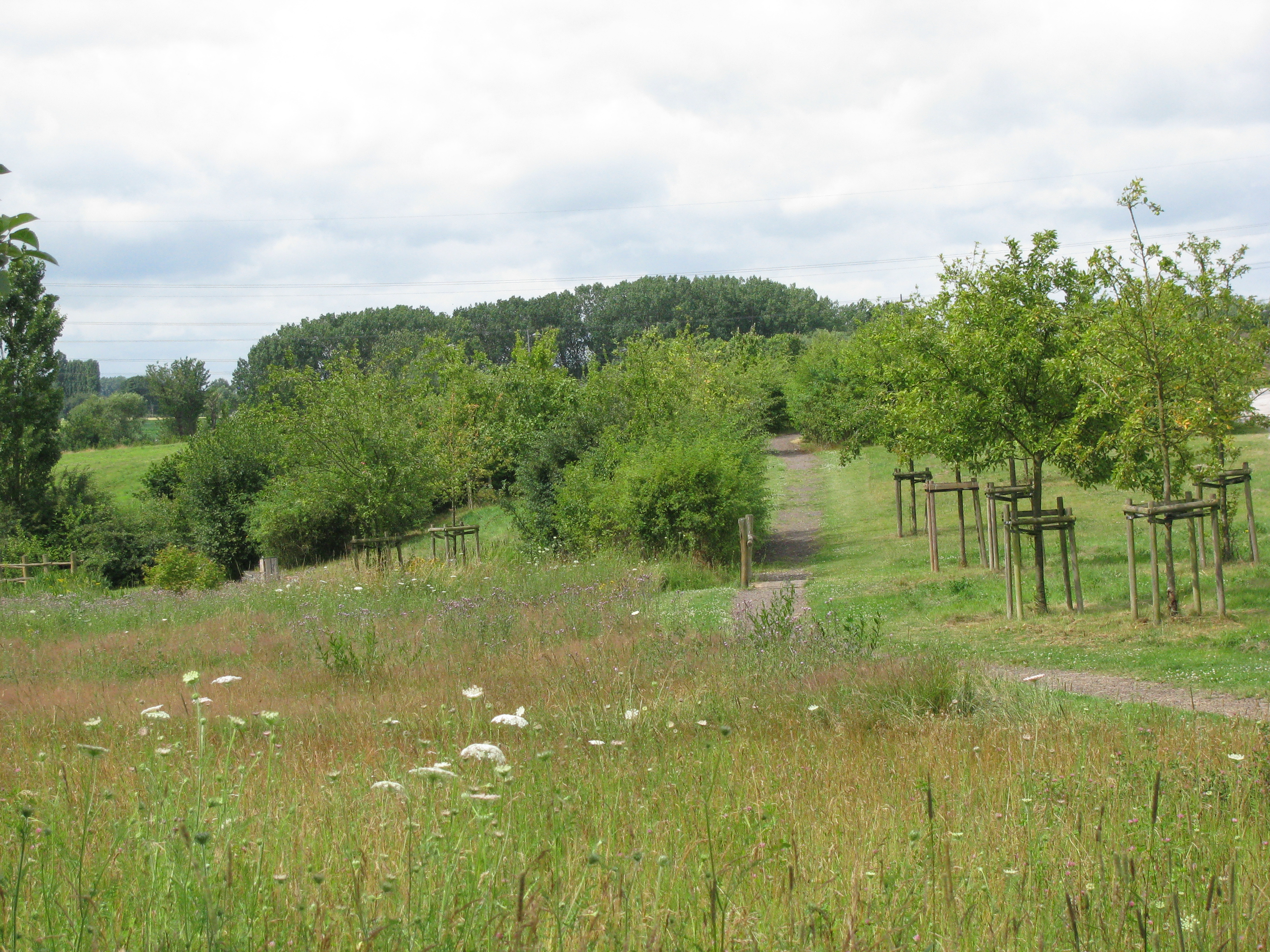
Meylemeersch/Mijlemeers

==== Petite Île/Klein Eiland ====
Located in the east of Anderlecht, this district lies between two branches of the Senne, which separate near the Boulevard Paepsem/Paapsemlaan: to the east, the Senne itself, flowing more or less parallel to the Midi-Ruisbroek railway line; and to the west, the "Lesser Senne" (French: Petite Senne, Dutch: Kleine Zenne), a man-made arm of the river flowing under the current Hermès Roundabout and then alongside the Rue des Goujons/Grondelsstraat. It is slated for major redevelopment under the CityGate project, transforming the former industrial area into a mixed‑use and sustainable neighbourhood.

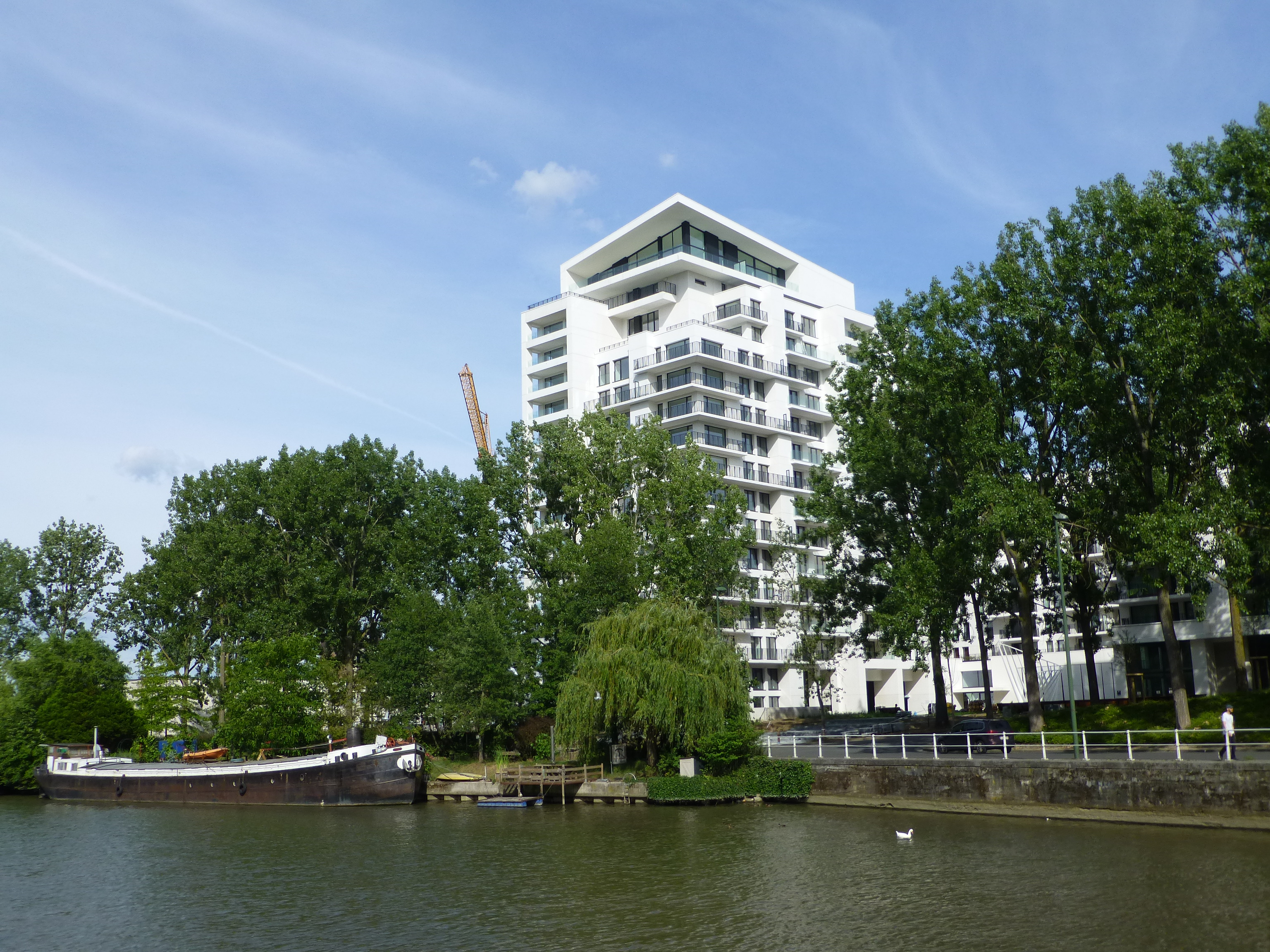
Nautilus project on the Digue du Canal/Vaartdijk

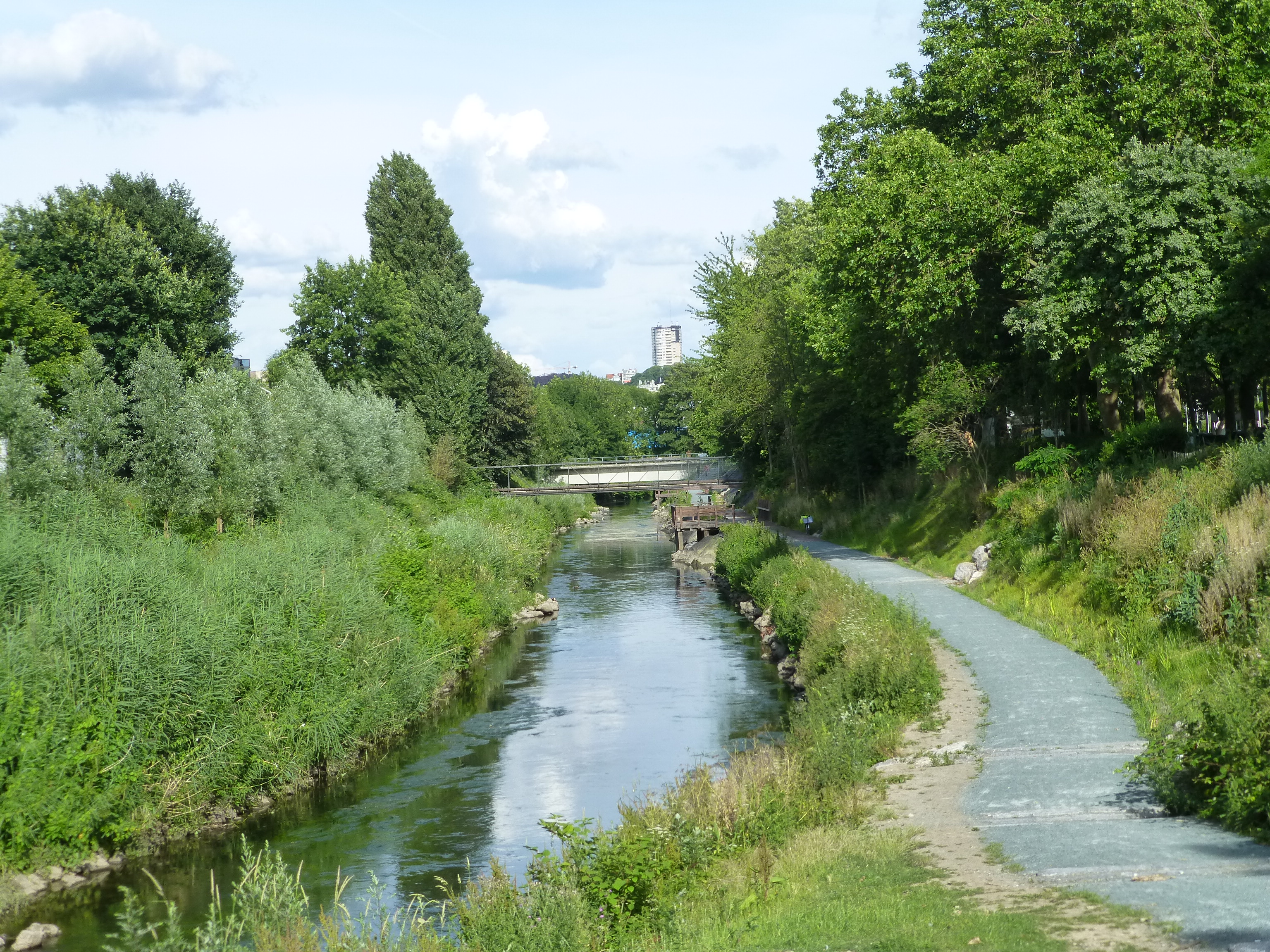
Senne near the Boulevard Paepsem/Paapsemlaan

=== Auderghem/Oudergem ===
==== Historical centre ====
The historical centre of Auderghem is the municipality's central district.

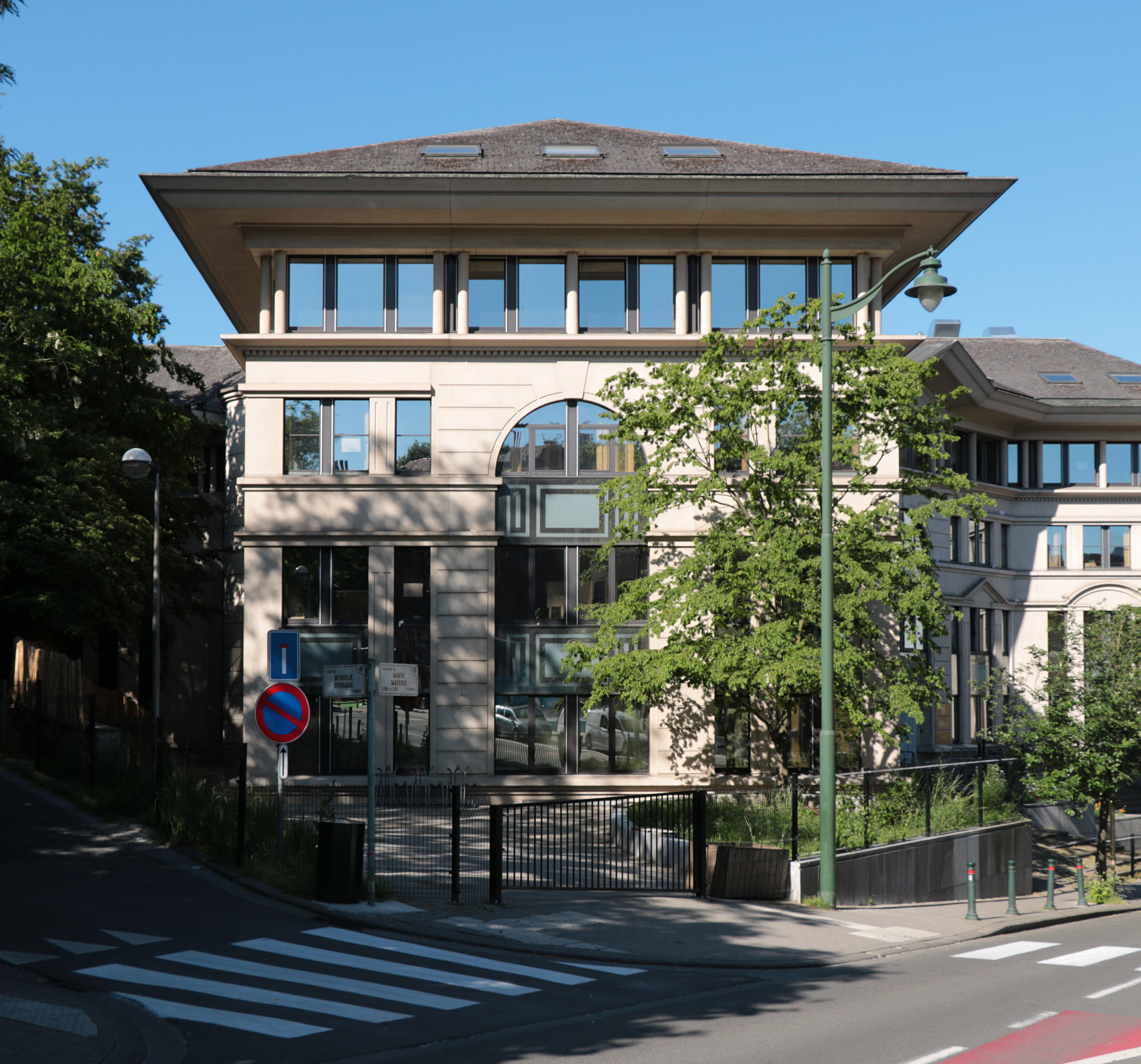
Place Communale/Gemeenteplein

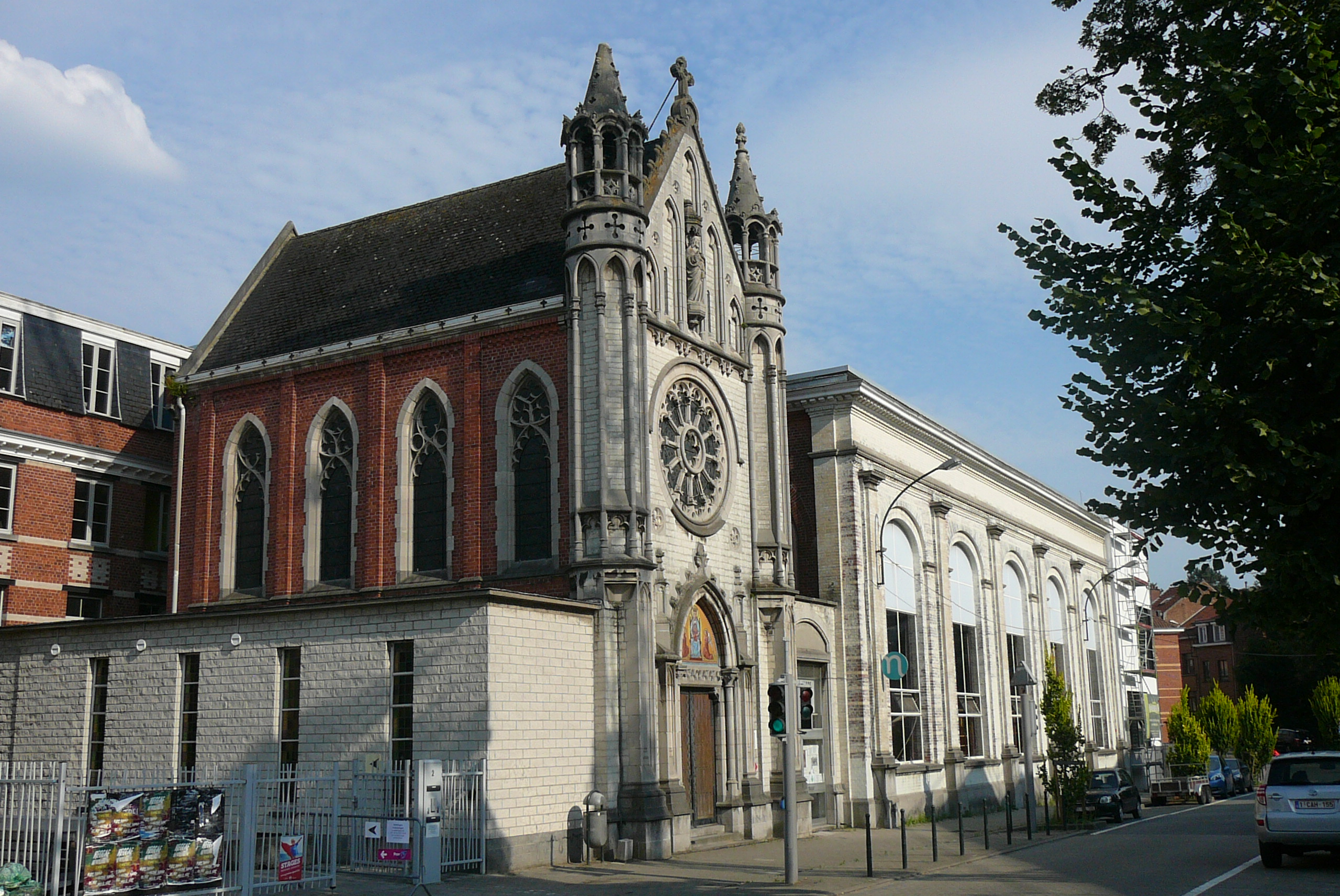
Chapel of St. Marcellin Champagnat and Lutgardiscollege

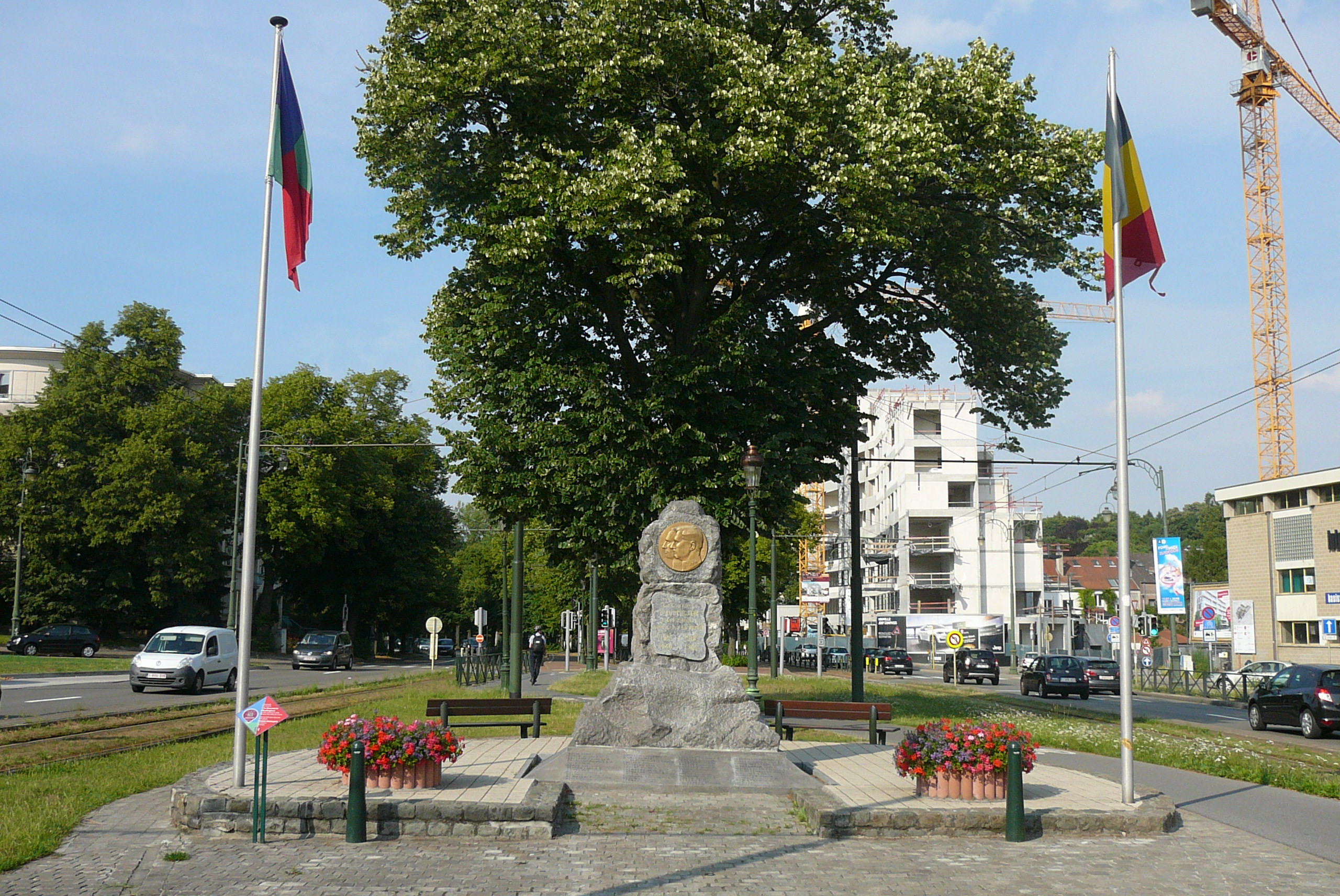
World War I and II memorial on the Souverain Roundabout

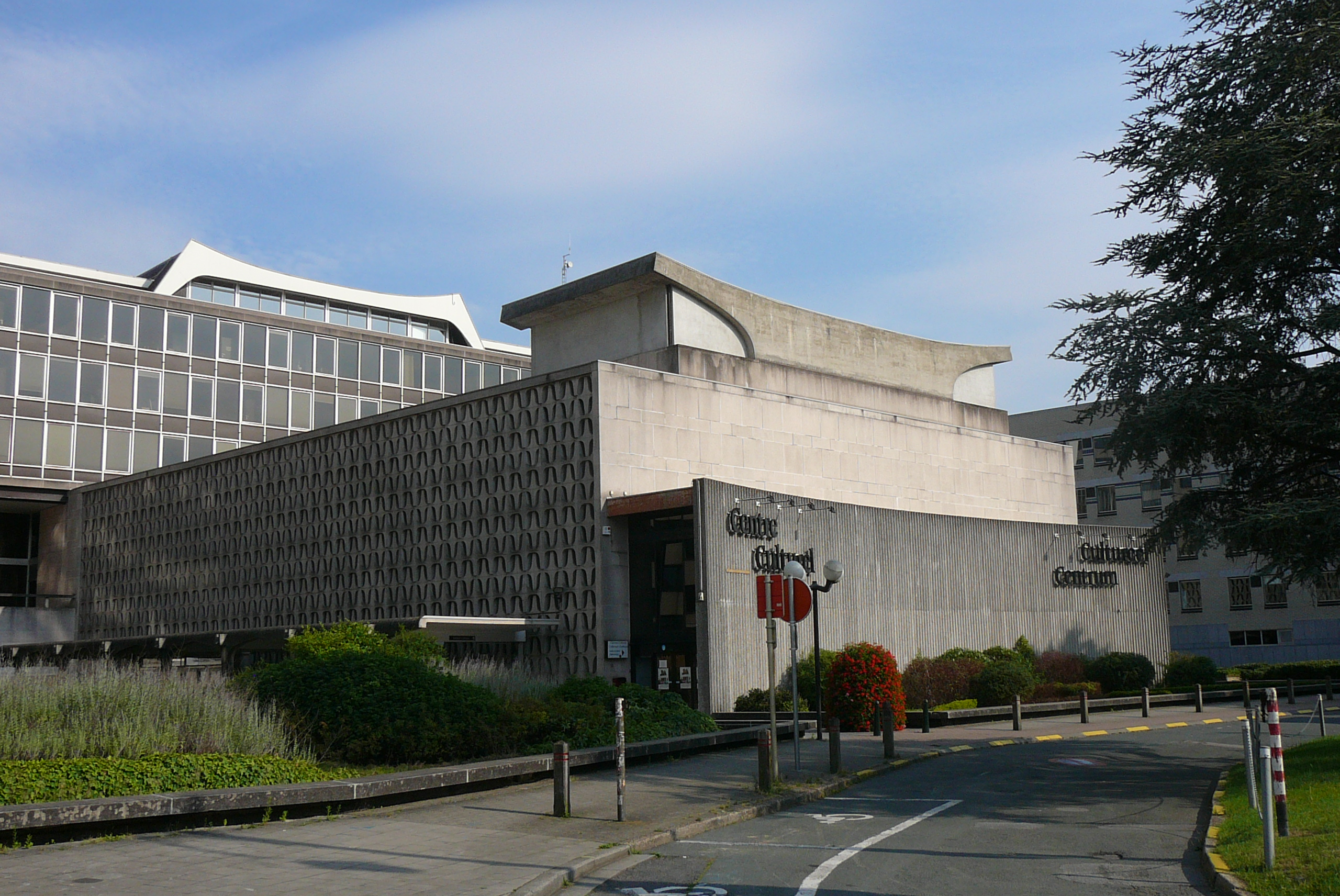
Auderghem's Cultural Centre

==== Val Duchesse/Hertoginnedal (Putdael) ====
Sometimes also known as Putdael (also spelled Putdaal), Val Duchesse/Hertoginnedal is a renowned residential area of Brussels, bordering the municipalities of Auderghem and Woluwe-Saint-Pierre. Situated between the Avenue de Tervueren/Tervurenlaan, the Chaussée de Tervueren/Tervuursesteenweg and the grounds of the Château of Val Duchesse, from which it takes its name, this district is one of the most prestigious in the city.

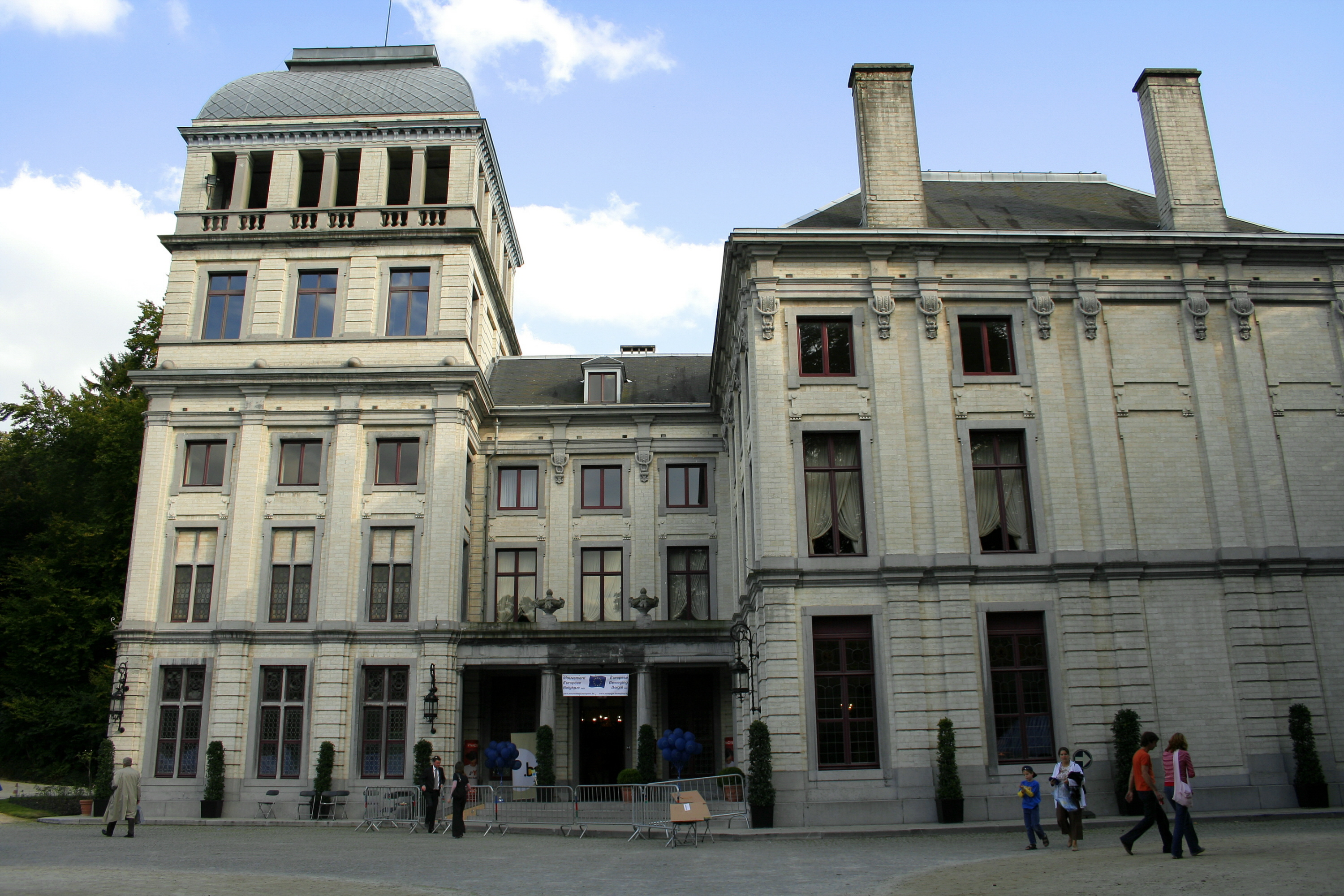
Château of Val Duchesse

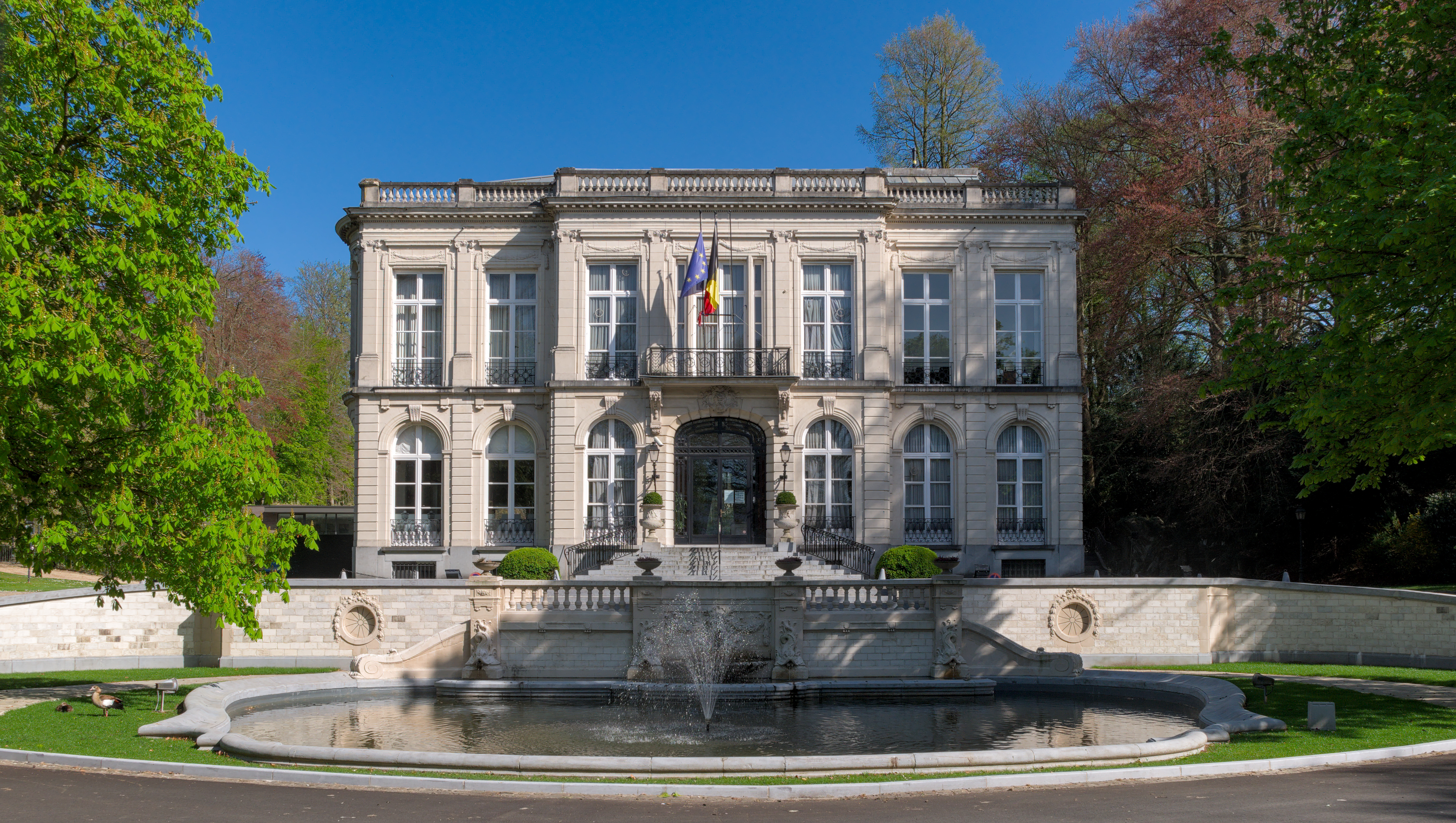
Château Sainte-Anne

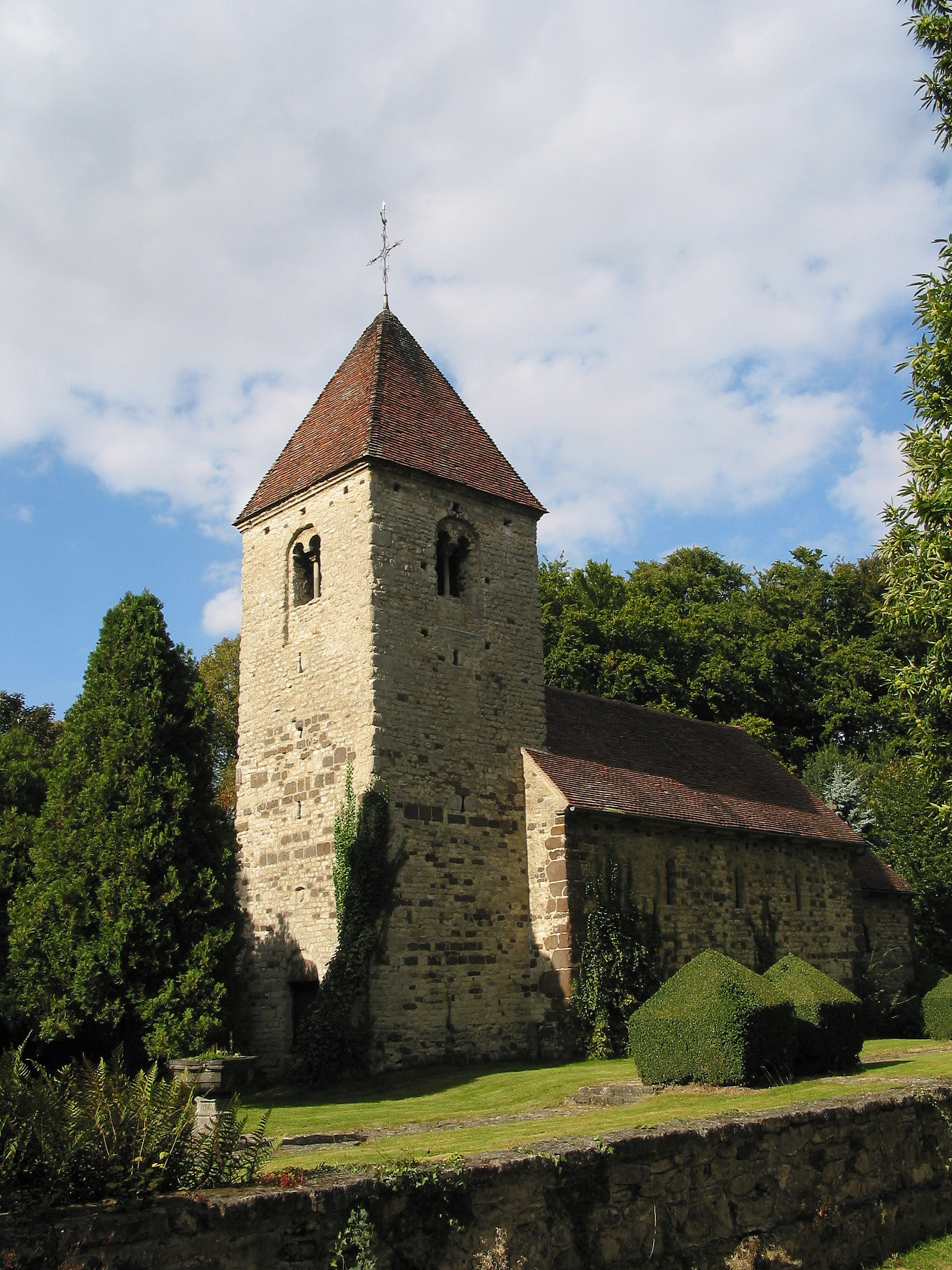
Chapel of St. Anne

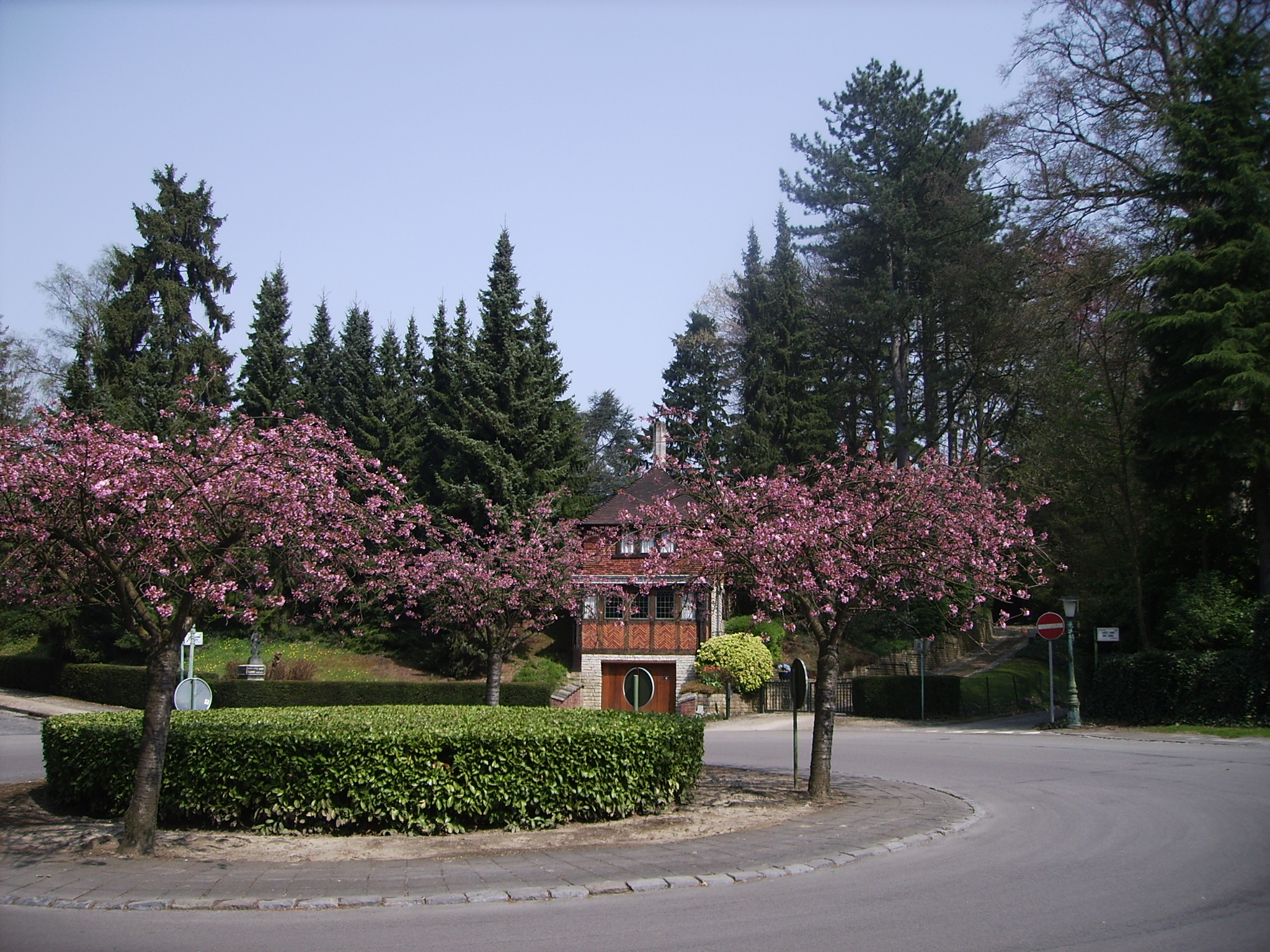
St. Anne Roundabout

==== Blankedelle (Transvaal) ====
Located in the south of Auderghem, below the Herman Debroux–Leonard crossroads section of the Chaussée de Wavre/Waversesteenweg, this district surrounds the Church of Our Lady of Blankedelle. It comprises a residential area to the west and a forested area to the east, the latter being part of the Sonian Forest. As cartridges were manufactured there for the Boers of the Transvaal (modern-day South Africa), the area was referred to by the locals as "Those from the Transvaal". Later, it became simply known as "Transvaal".

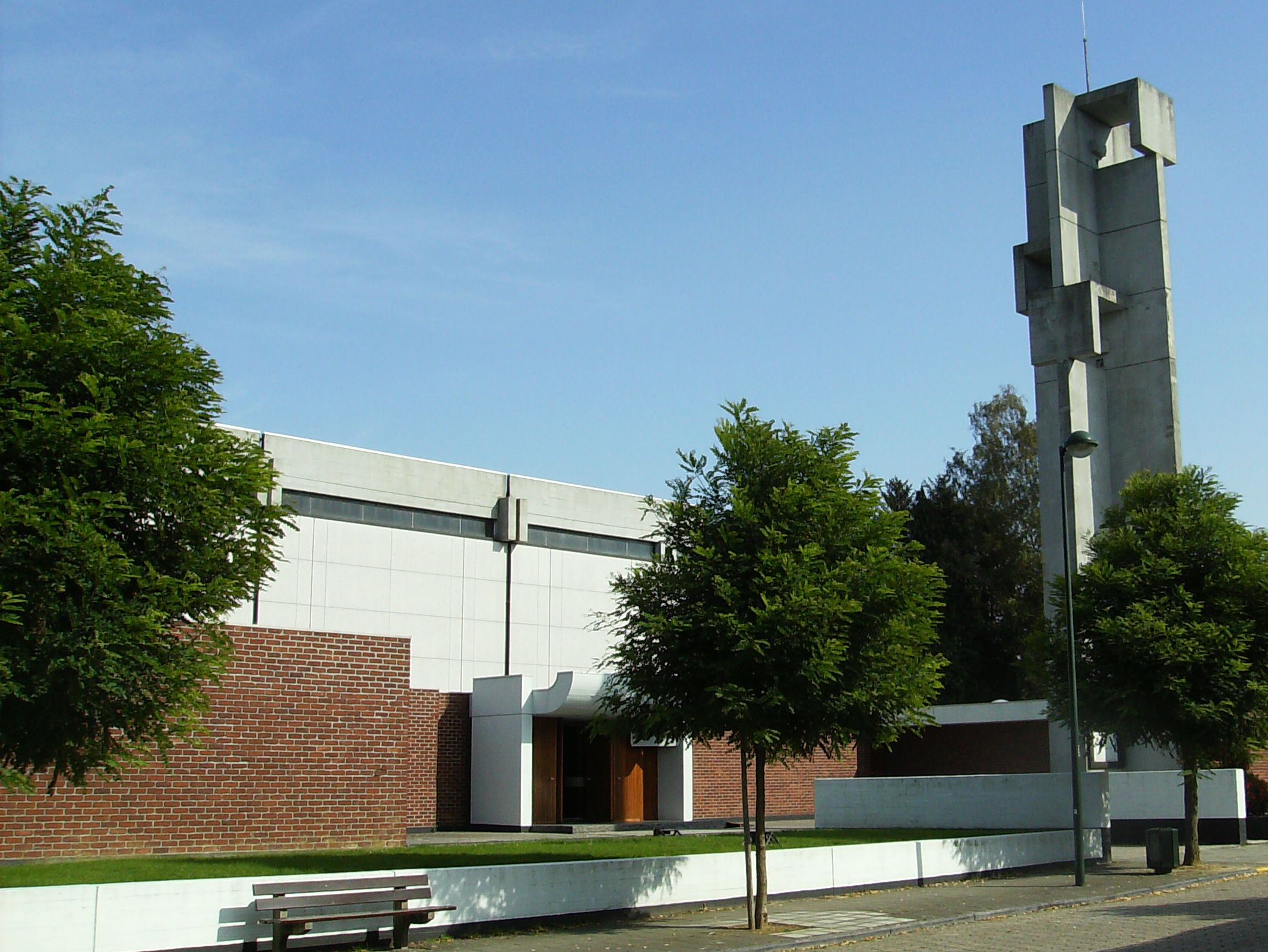
Church of Our Lady of Blankedelle

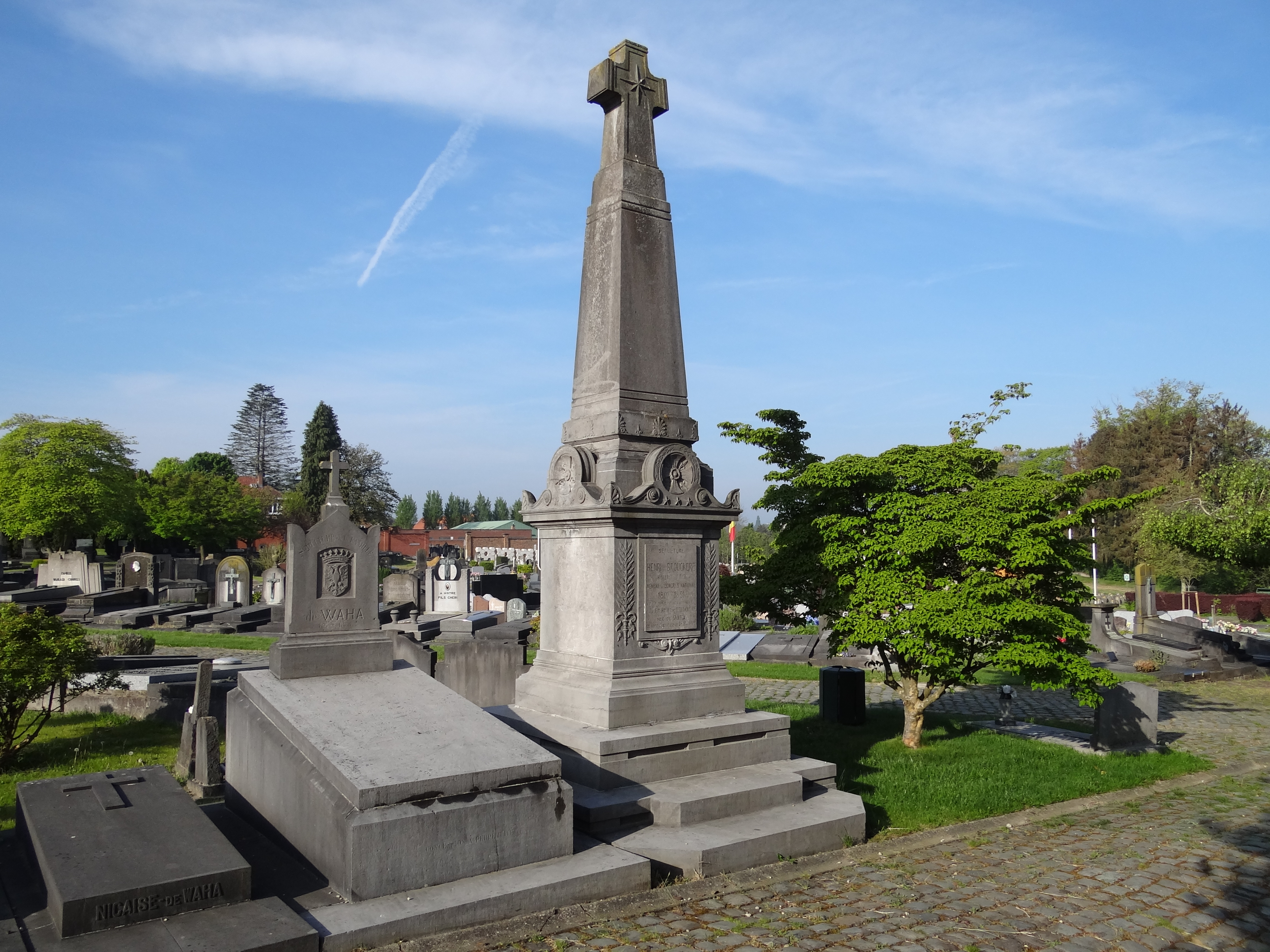
Auderghem Cemetery

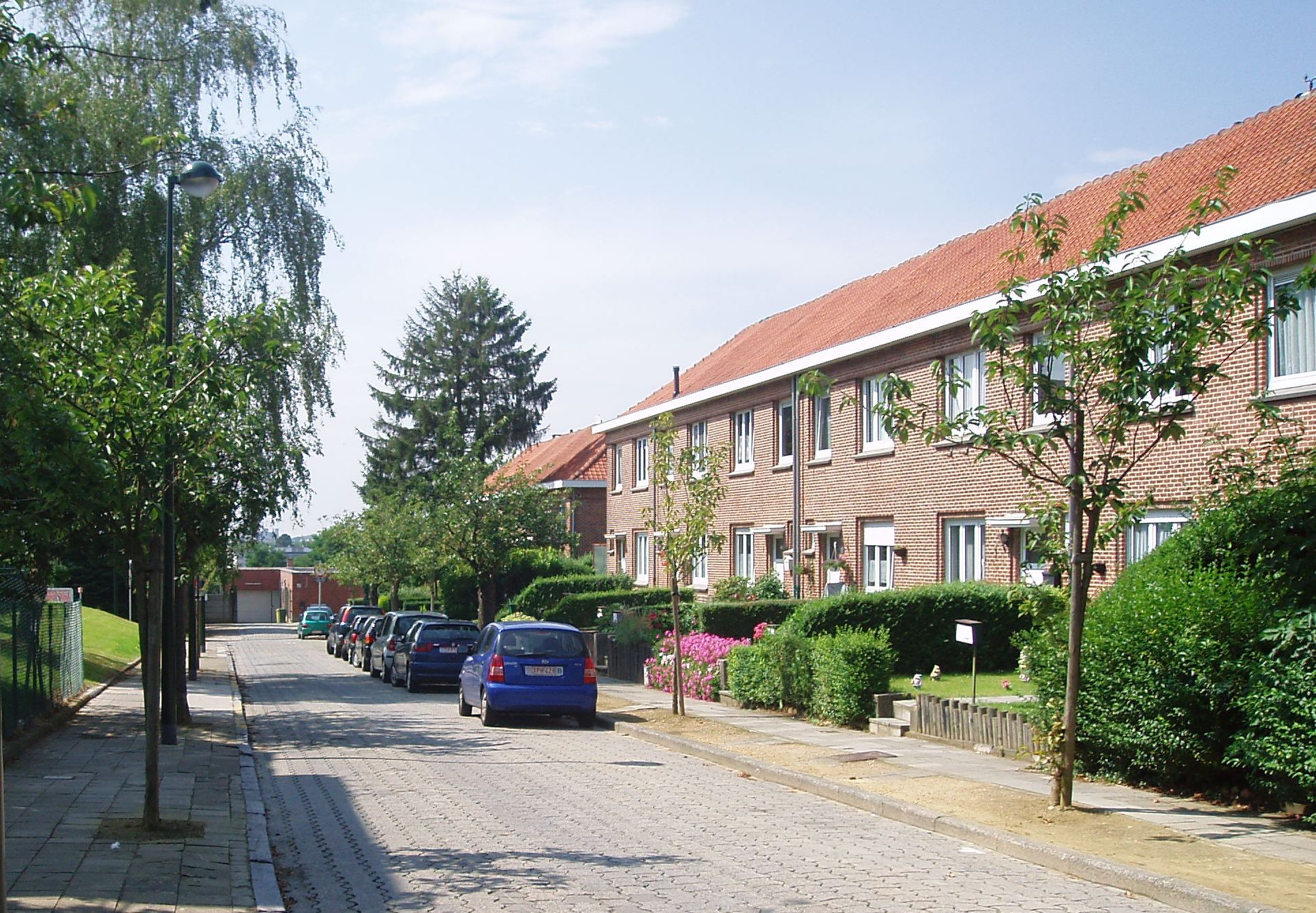
Rue Émile Rotiers/Émile Rotiersstraat

=== Berchem-Sainte-Agathe/Sint-Agatha-Berchem ===
==== Historical centre ====
The historical centre of Berchem-Sainte-Agathe is the municipality's central district.

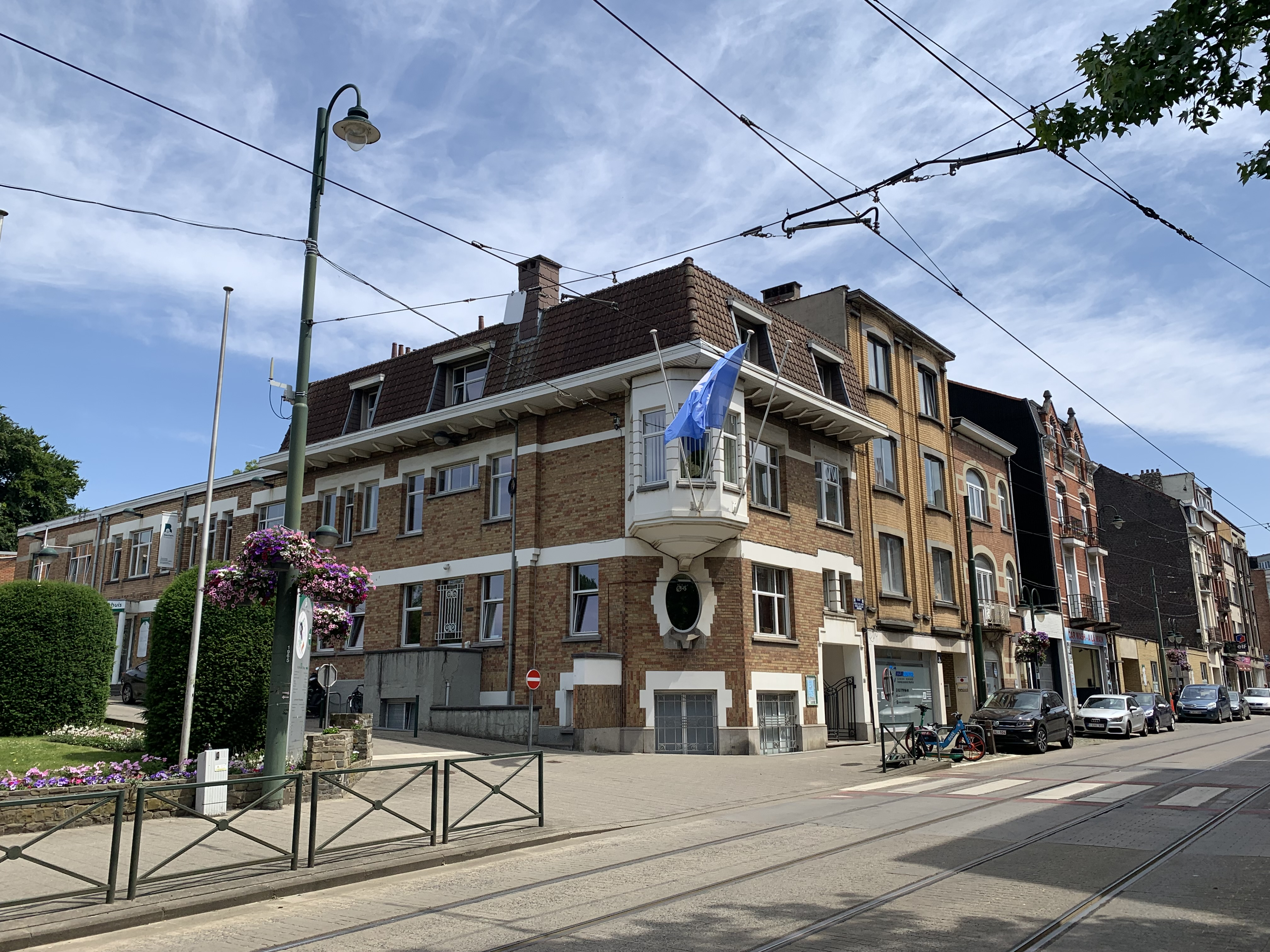
Berchem-Sainte-Agathe's Municipal Hall

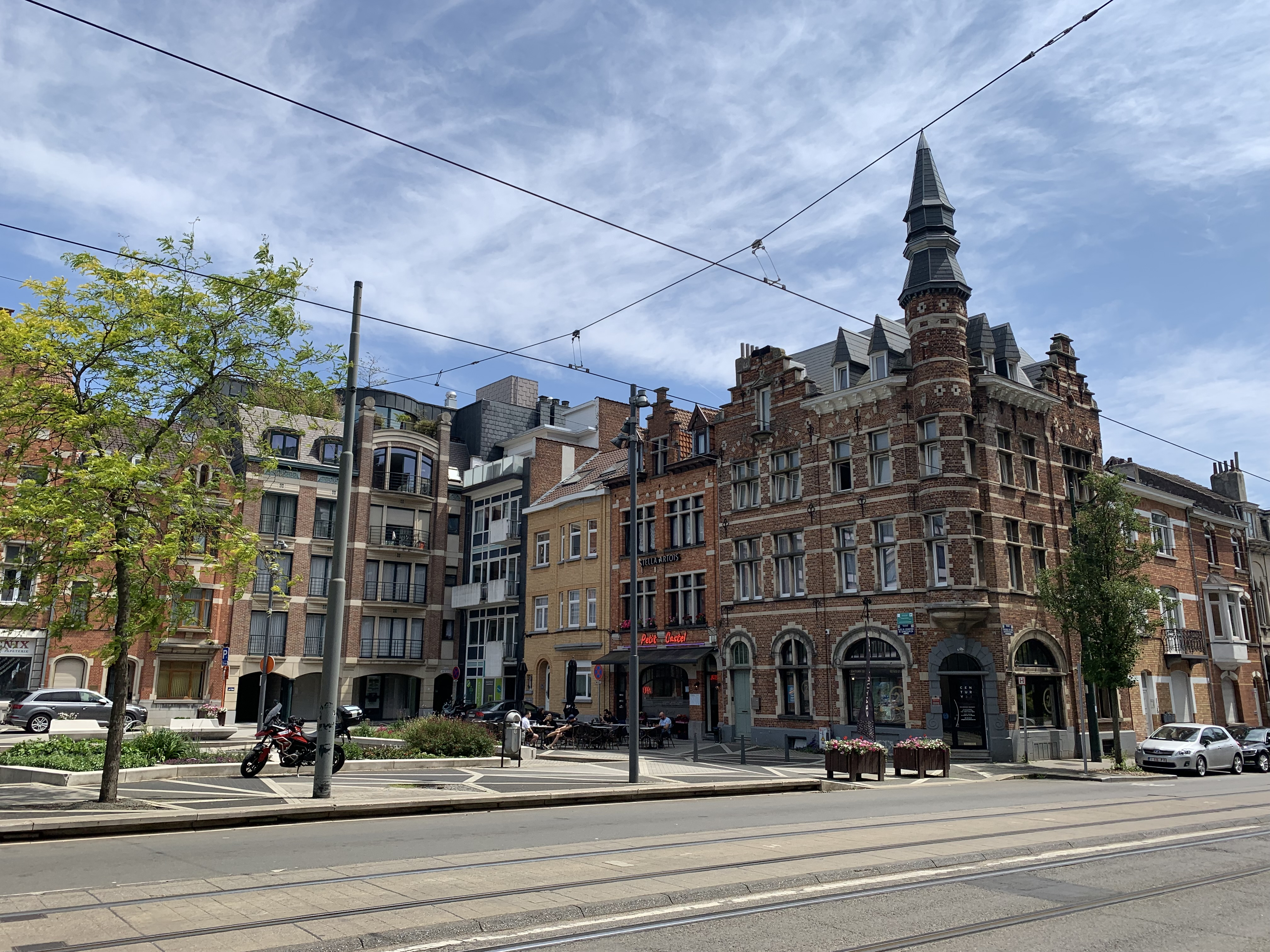
Place Docteur Schweitzer/Dokter Schweitzerplein

==== French Hospital ====
Located in the east of Berchem-Sainte-Agathe, at the junction with Koekelberg and Molenbeek-Saint-Jean, this residential and mixed urban district developed around the former site of the French Hospital. Originally founded around 1930 to treat French nationals suffering from tropical diseases, this historic institution was later opened to a broader public before being decommissioned in the 1980s. Nowadays, the district consists mainly of apartment buildings and single-family homes.

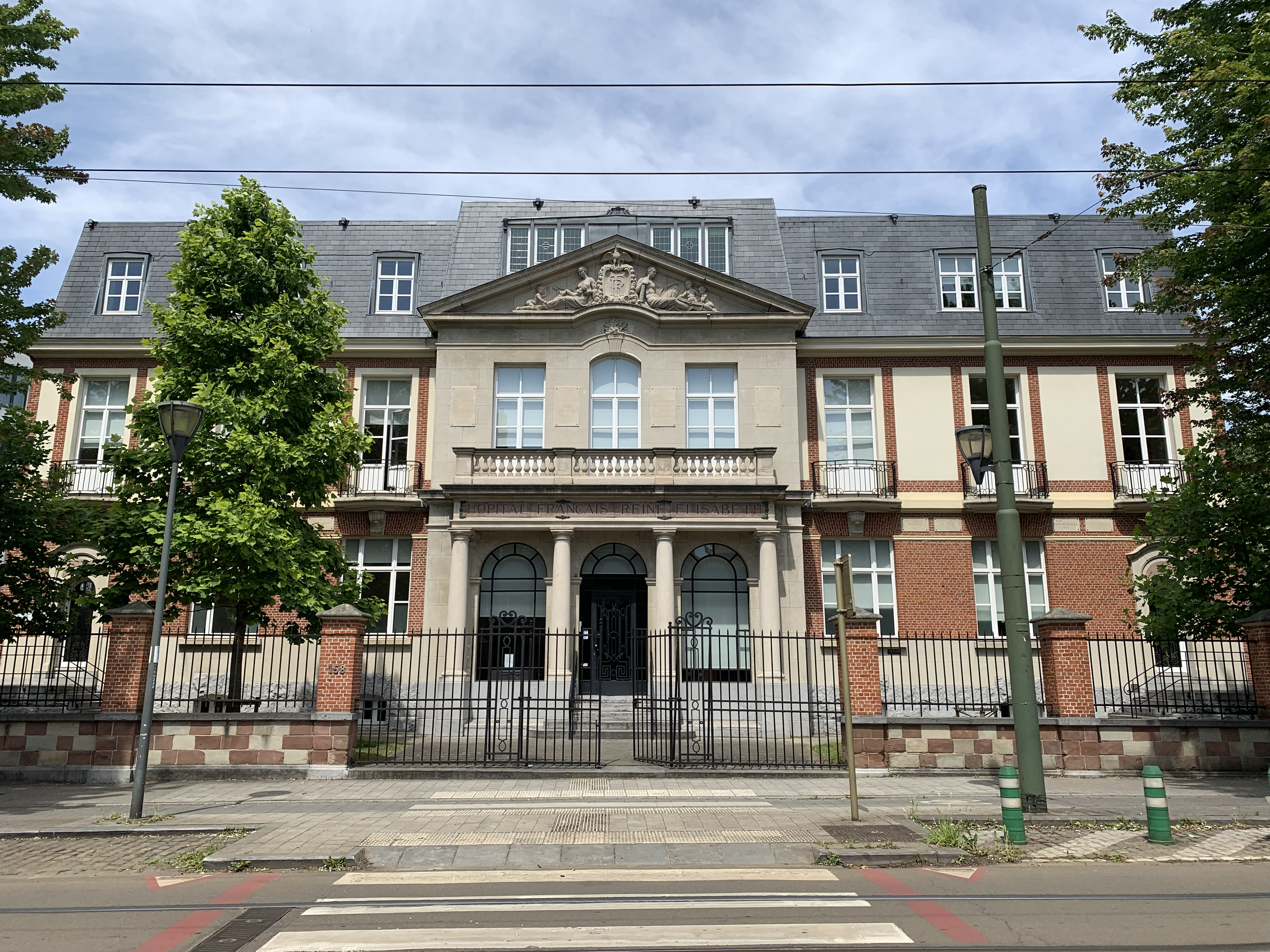
French Hospital

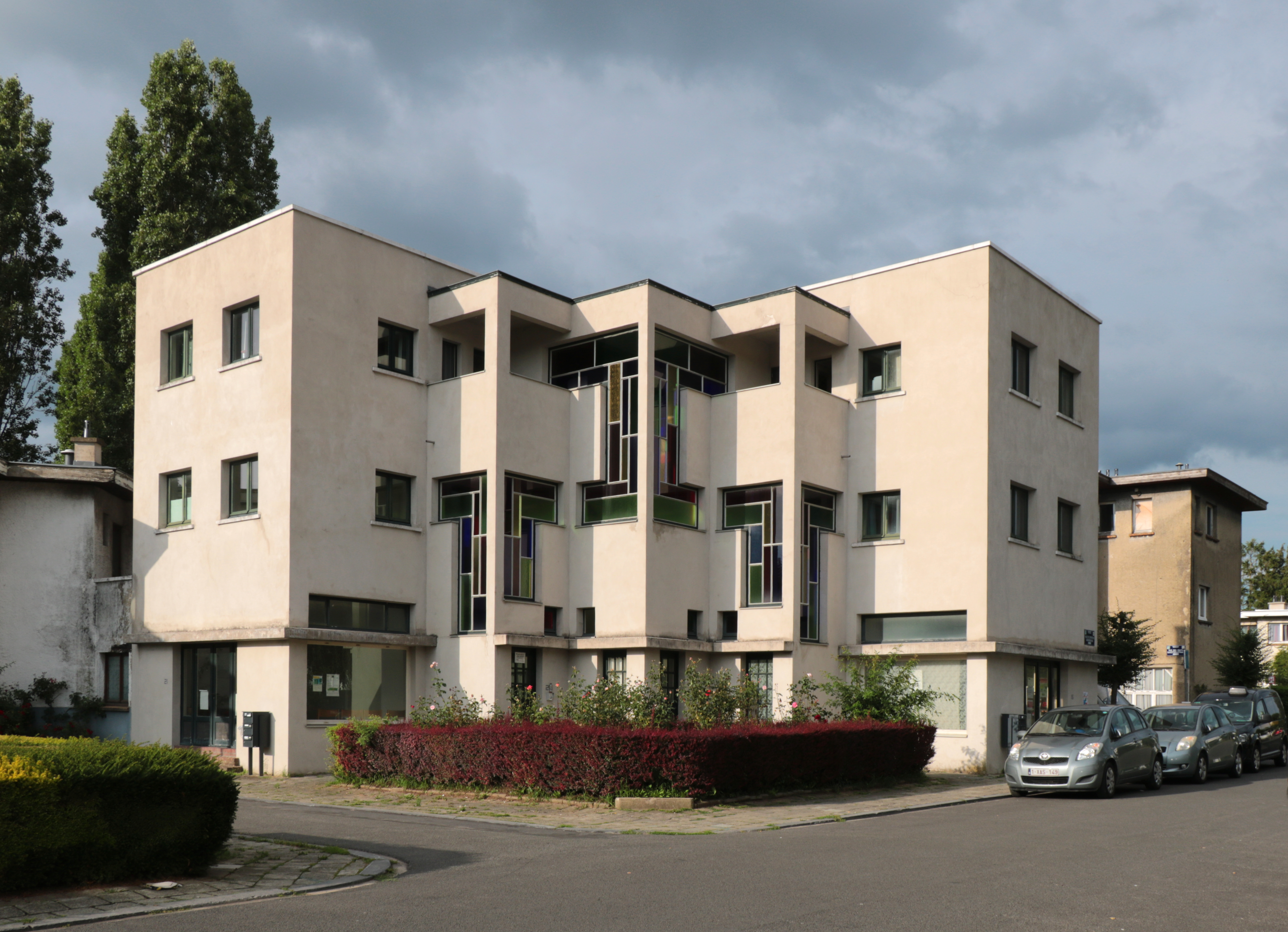
Cité Moderne

==== Potaarde ====
Located in the south-west of Berchem-Sainte-Agathe, Potaarde is a primarily residential district characterised by a suburban atmosphere, abundant greenery, and proximity to the Kattebroek nature reserve. This protected site, composed of meadows, wetlands, and wooded slopes, preserves part of the original landscape of the Molenbeek valley. The neighbourhood consists mainly of low-rise single-family houses built during the mid-20th century, along with more recent apartment developments, reflecting gradual urban densification.

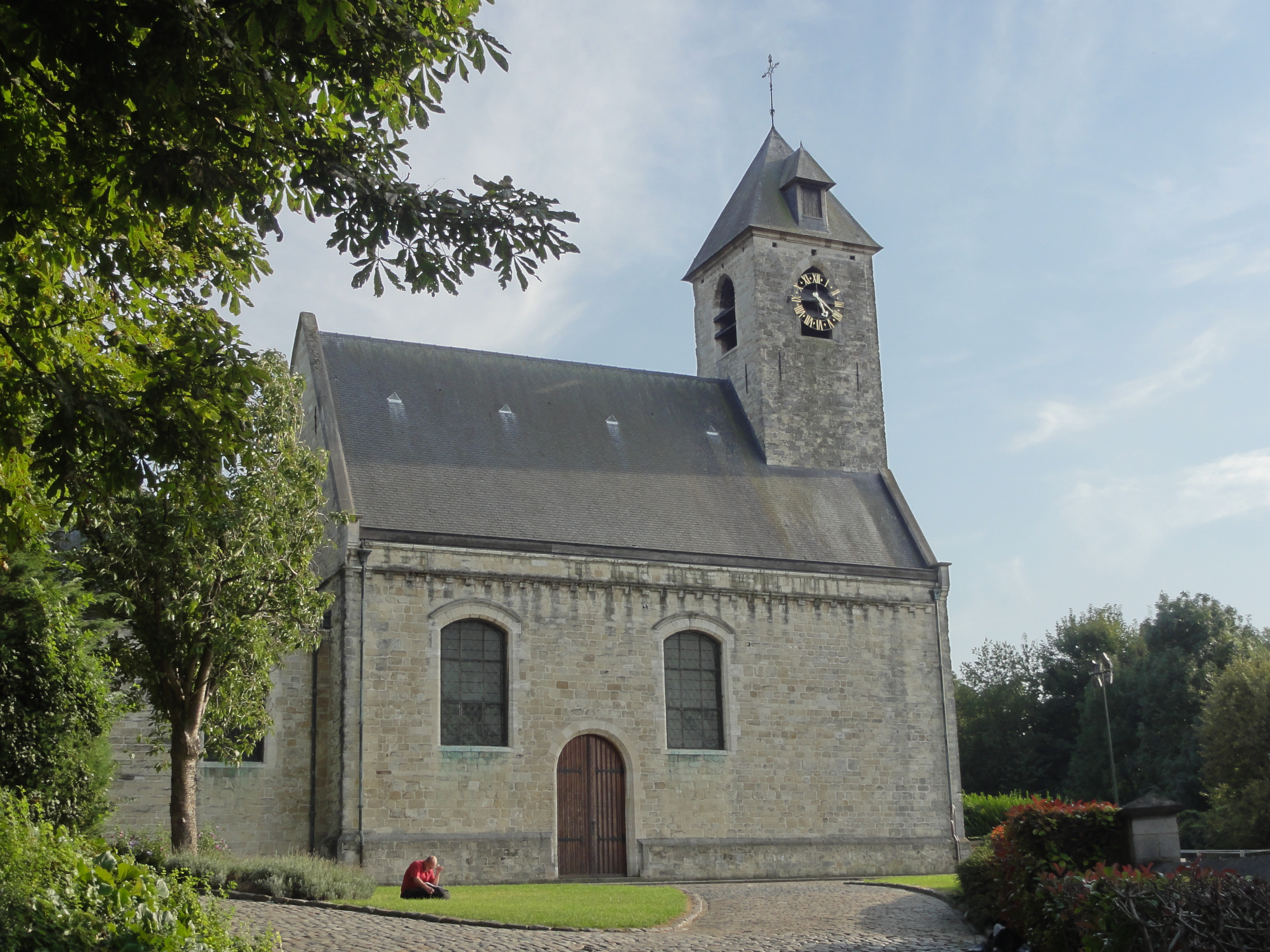
Former Church of St. Agatha

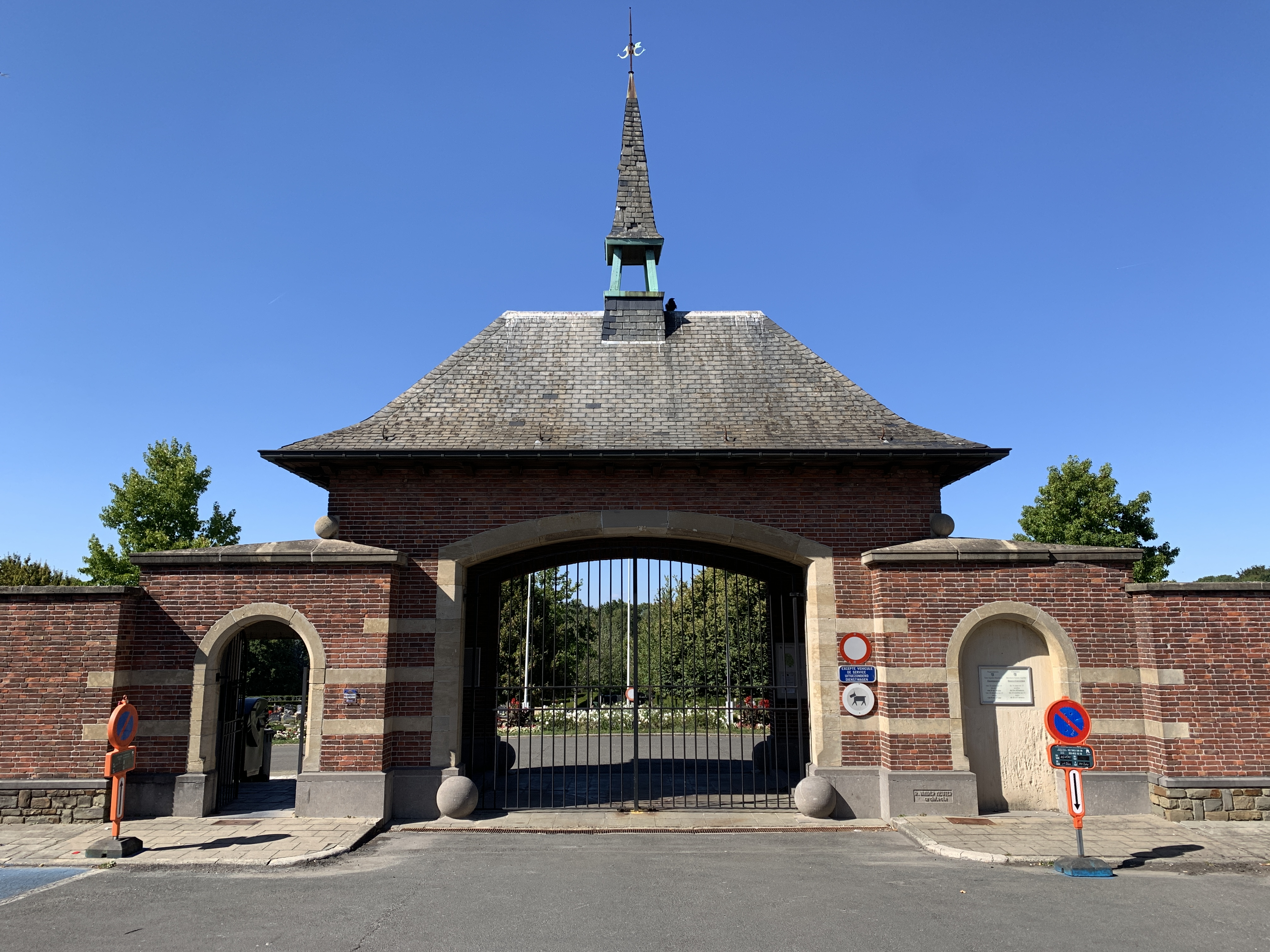
Berchem-Sainte-Agathe Cemetery

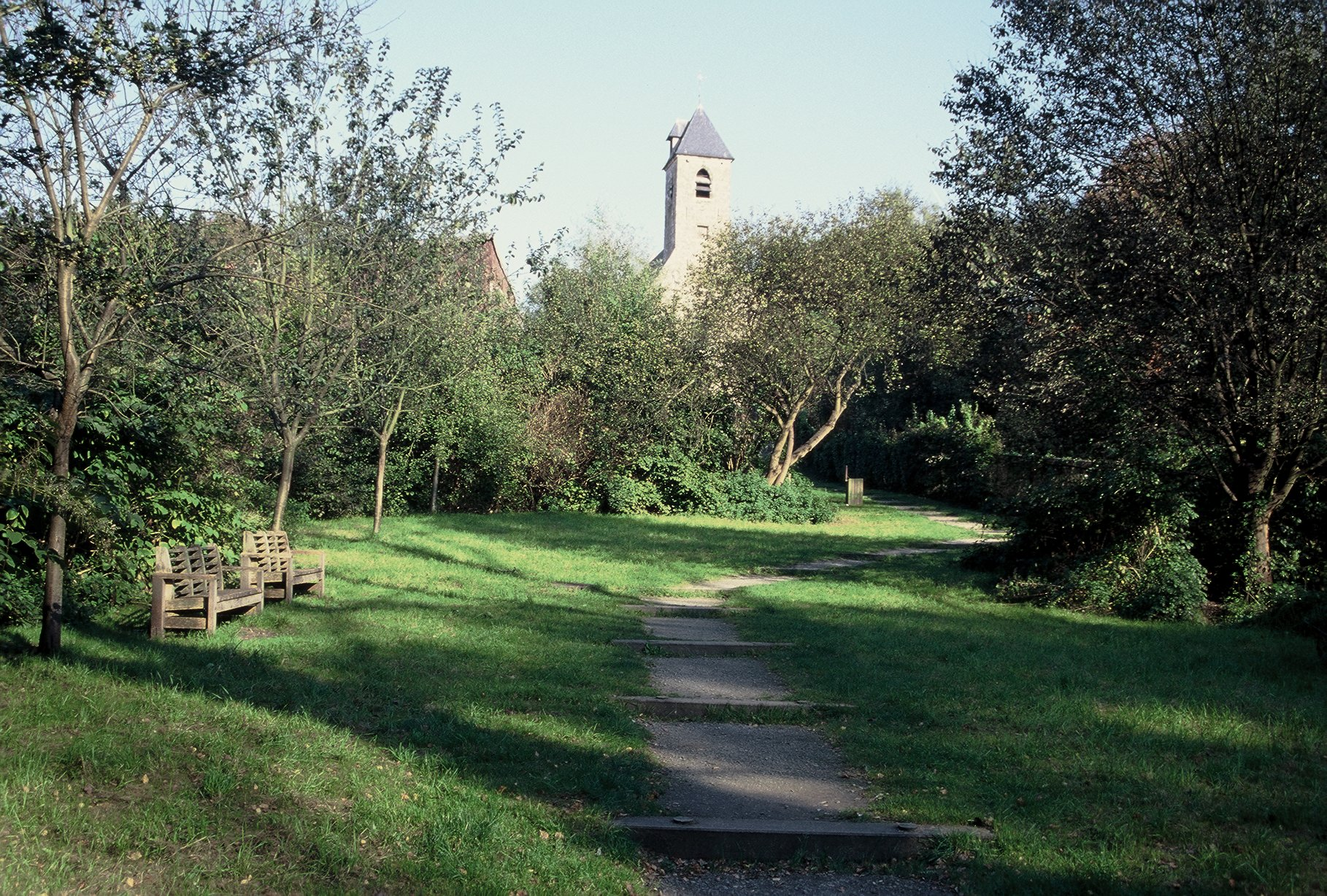
Wilder Wood

==== Zavelenberg ====
Located in the north of Berchem-Sainte-Agathe, facing the Basilix Shopping Center, the Zavelenberg is a remnant of the municipality's rural past.

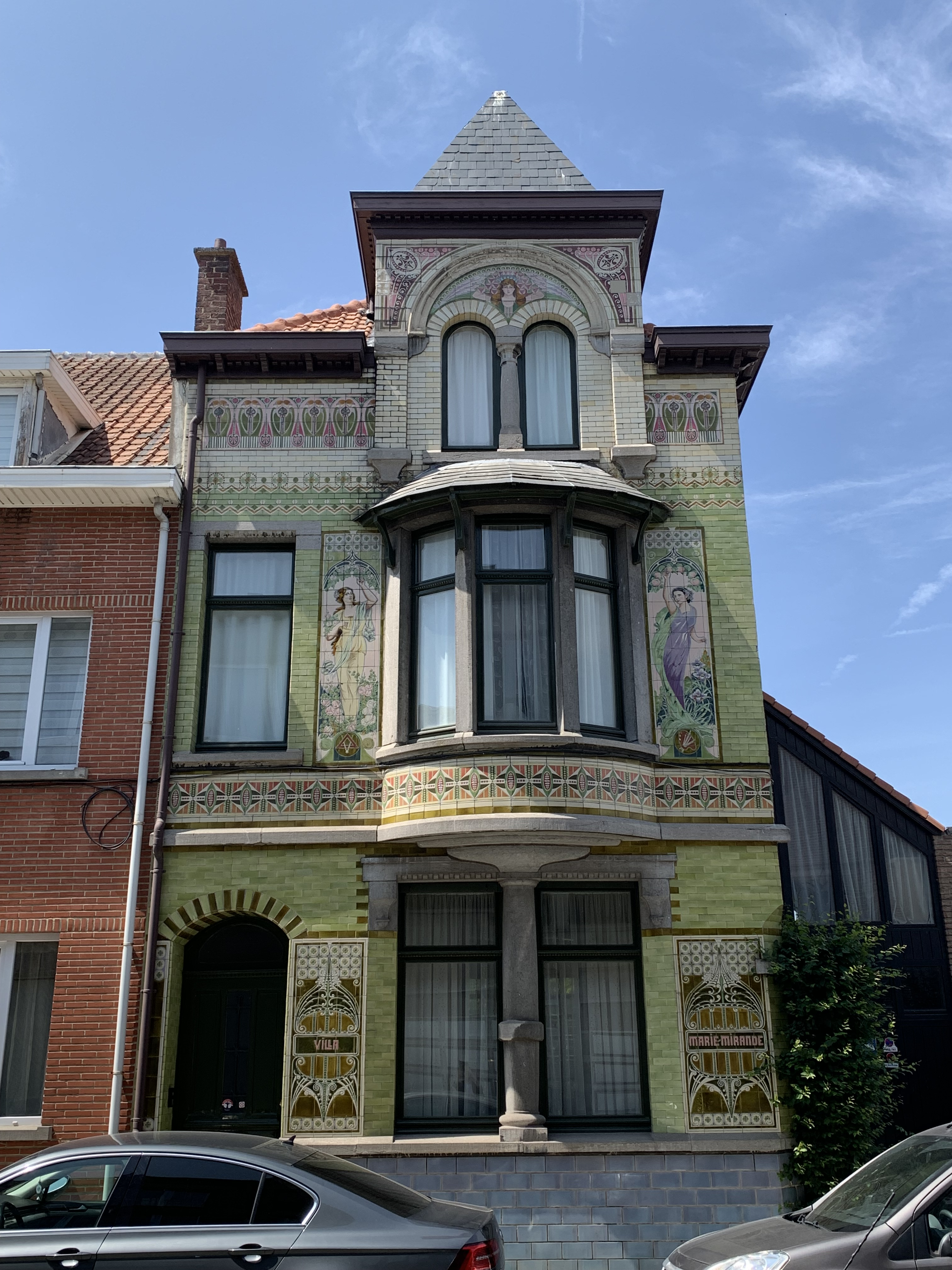
Villa Marie-Mirande

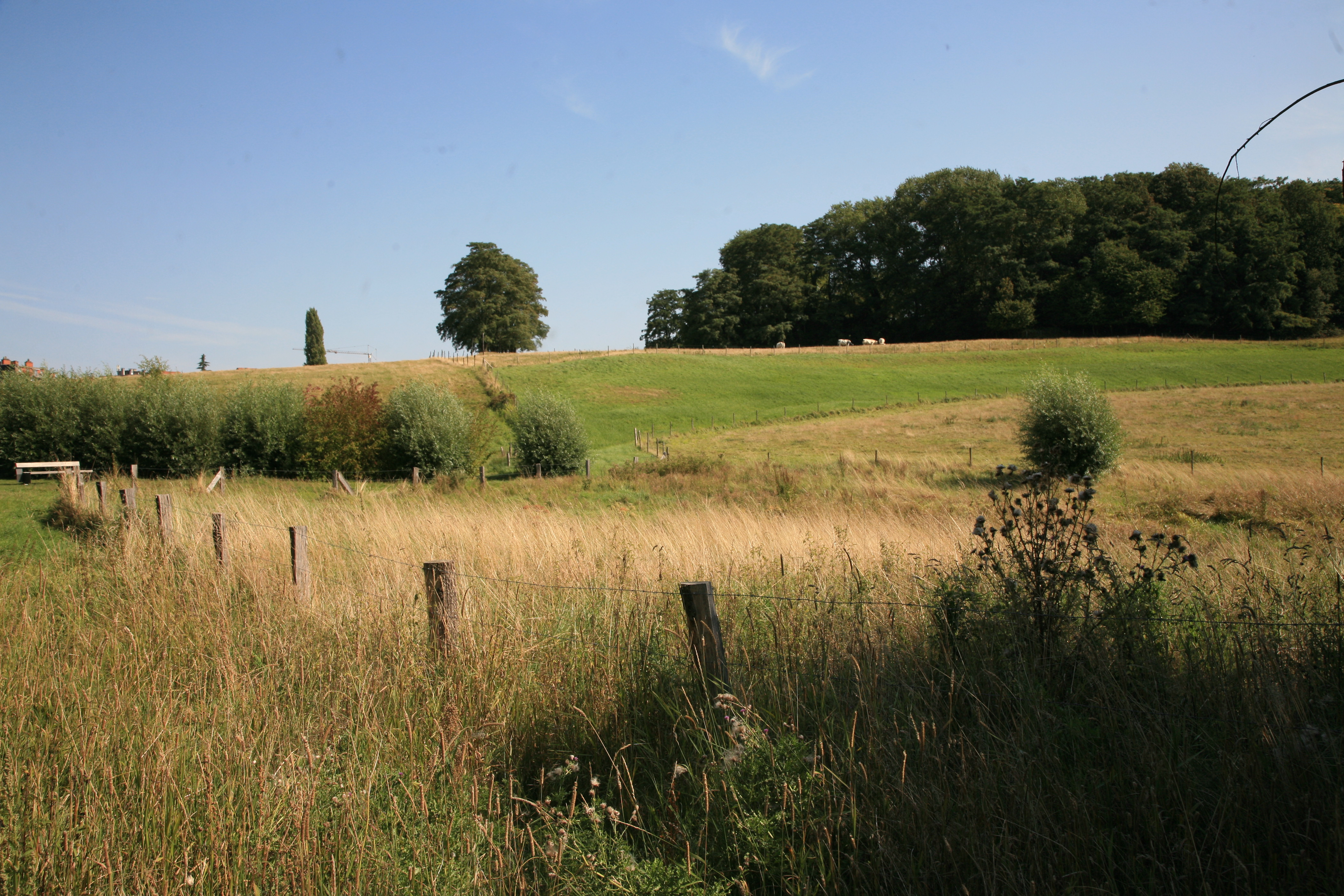
Zavelenberg

=== Etterbeek ===
==== Jourdan ====
Situated in the north-west of Etterbeek, close to Leopold Park and the European institutions, the Place Jourdan/Jourdanplein and its surrounding streets form the district's commercial and recreational centre. The square, which owes its name to a local philanthropist, boasts an array of shops, bars and restaurants, including Maison Antoine, one of Belgium's most famous friteries. Of a completely different character, the Barony House dates from 1680 and is the municipality's oldest surviving dwelling. At the neighbourhood's southern edge, along the Chaussée de Wavre/Waversesteenweg, lies Jean-Félix Hap Garden, home to the Bibliothèque communale Hergé French-language public library.

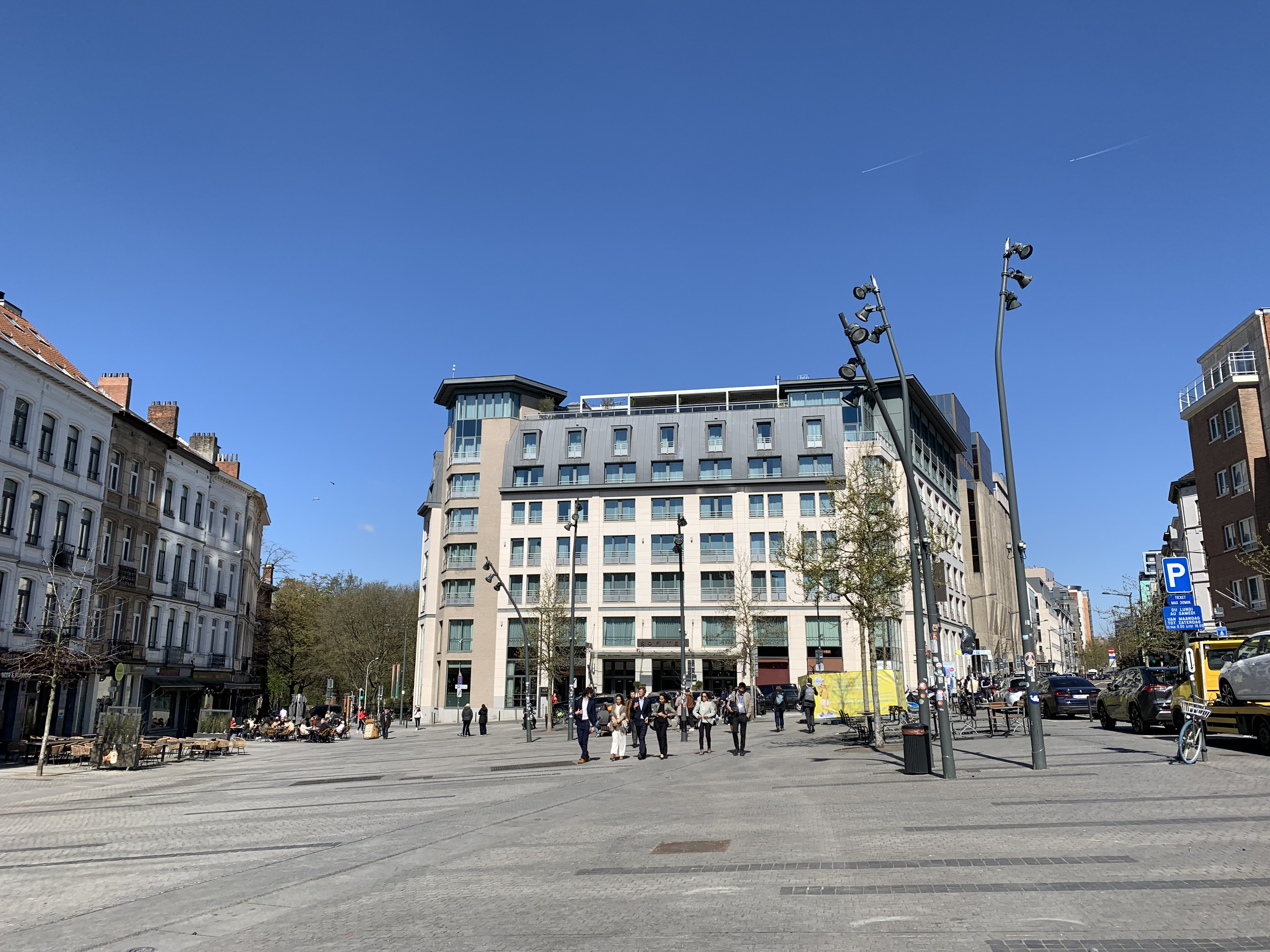
Place Jourdan/Jourdanplein

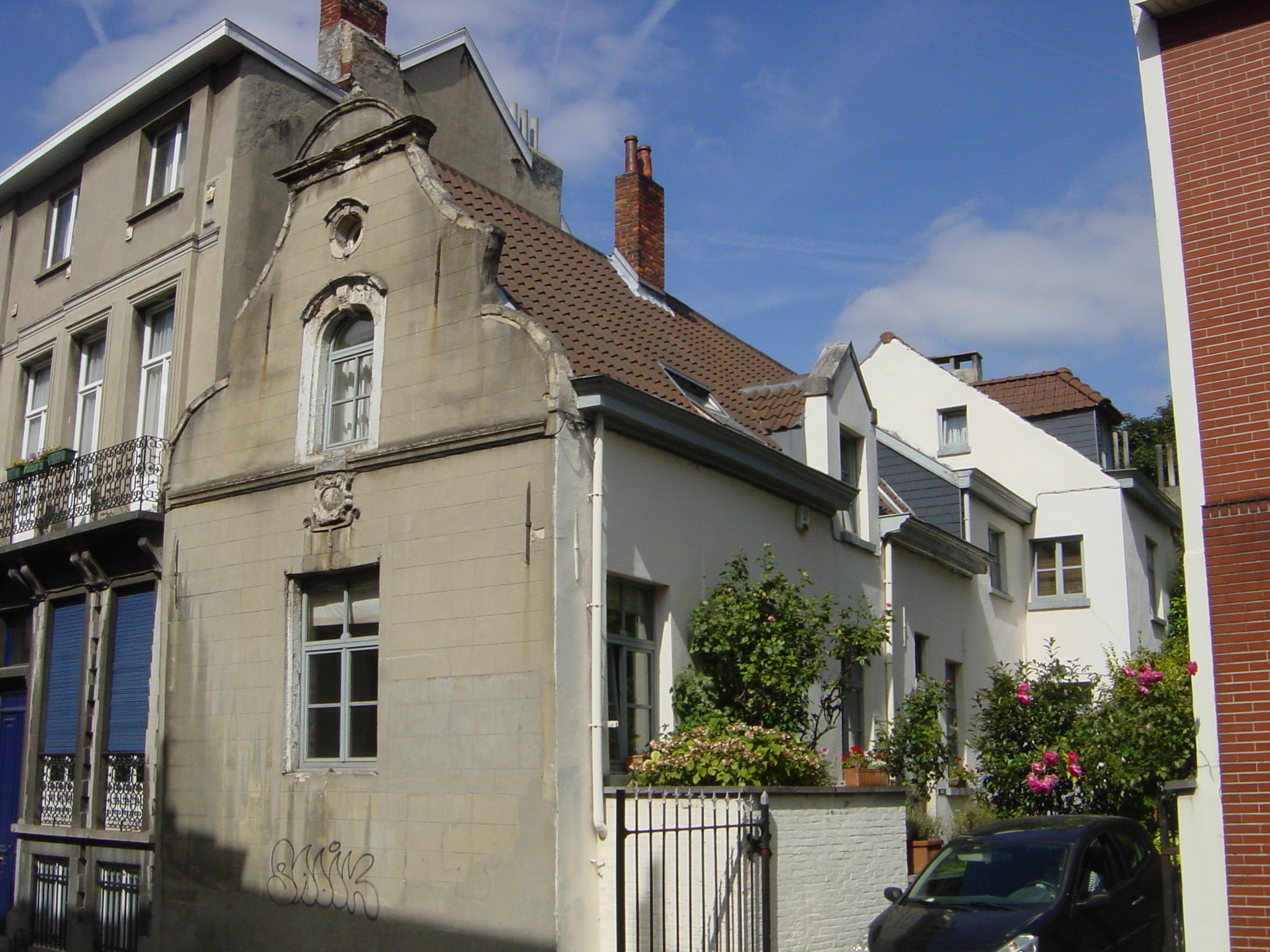
Barony House

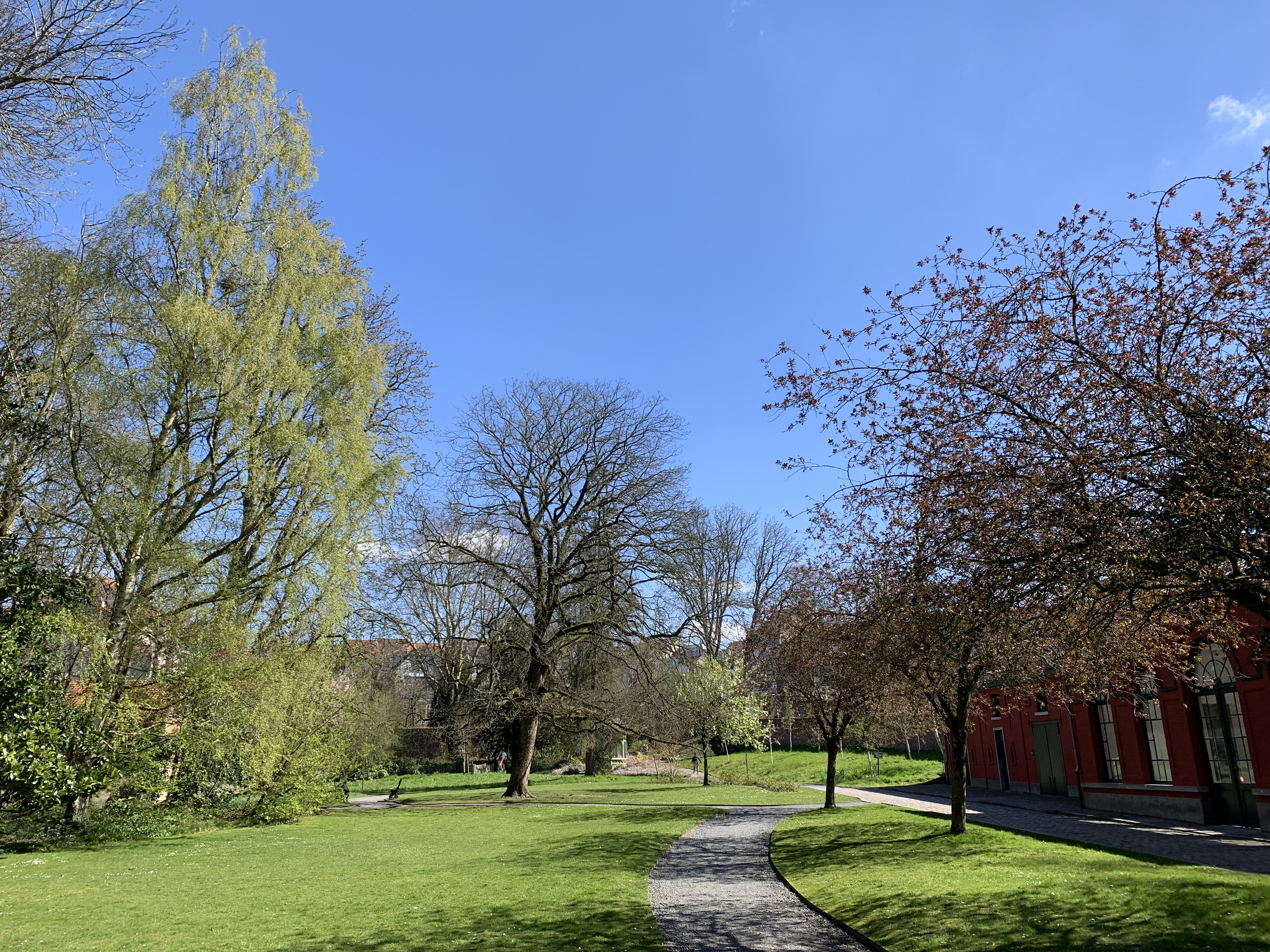
Jean-Félix Hap Garden

==== La Chasse/De Jacht ====
Located in the south of Etterbeek, La Chasse/De Jacht ("The Hunt") is best known for its military history, its diverse businesses and its mix of apartment buildings and small, formerly working-class houses. This district is centred around the Chasse crossroads where six major avenues converge. It extends over part of the Avenue d'Auderghem/Oudergemlaan to the north and goes as far as the Boulevard Général Jacques/Generaal Jacqueslaan to the south (formerly called the Boulevard Militaire/Militaire laan because it connects the Etterbeek barracks to the Avenue Louise/Louizalaan). The Municipal Hall of Etterbeek is located on the Avenue des Casernes/Kazernenlaan, in the heart of this district.

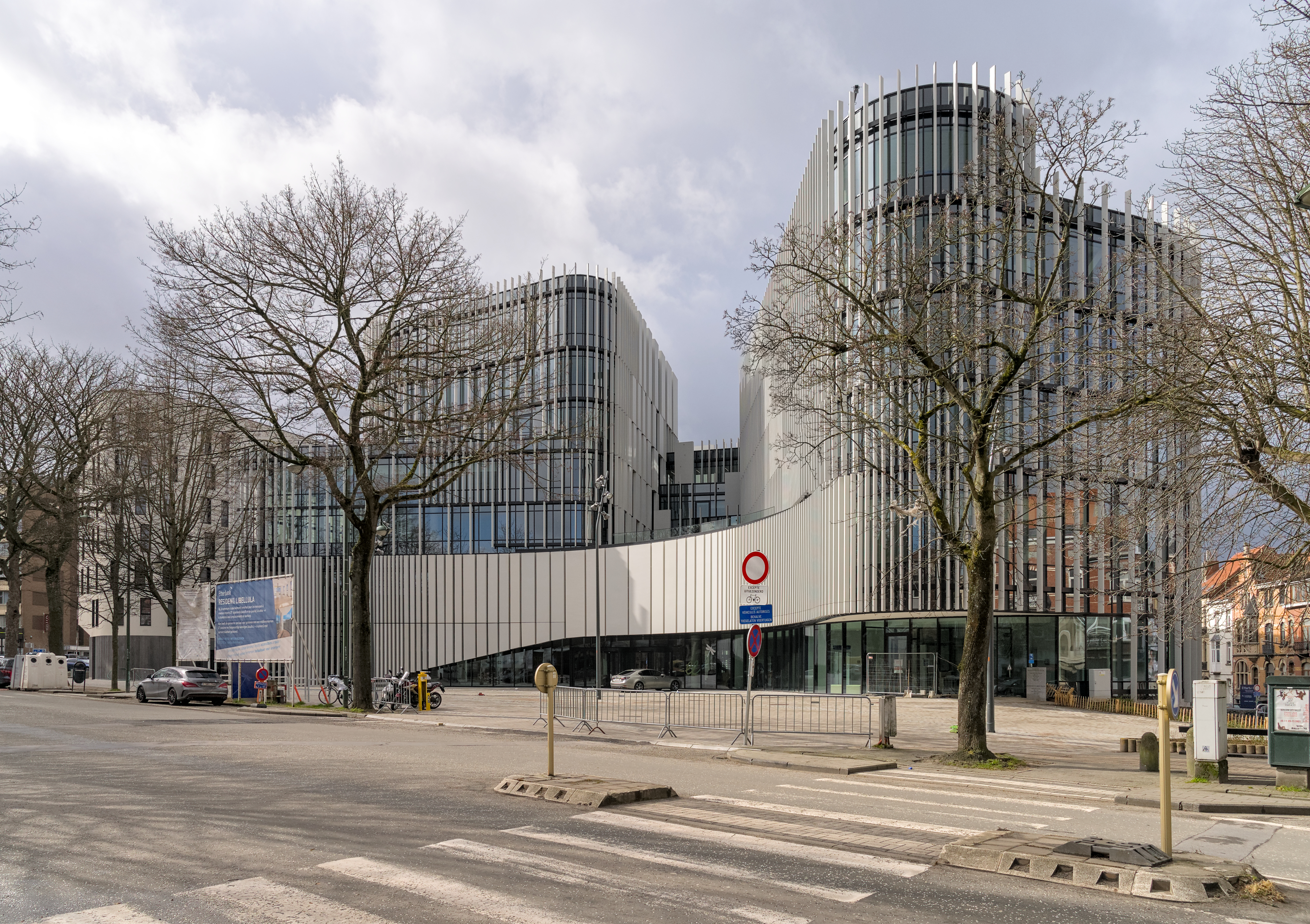
Etterbeek's Municipal Hall

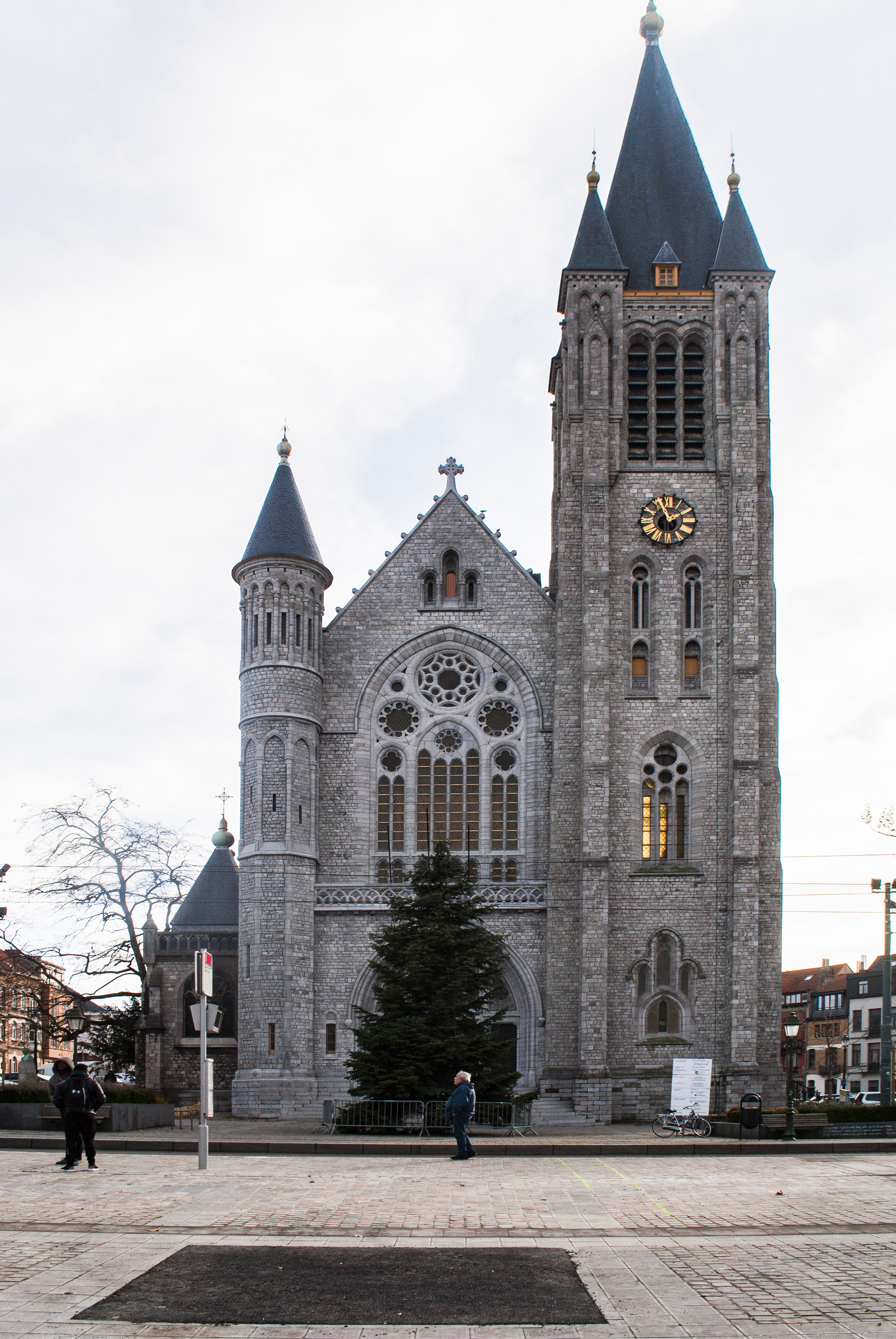
Church of St. Anthony of Padua

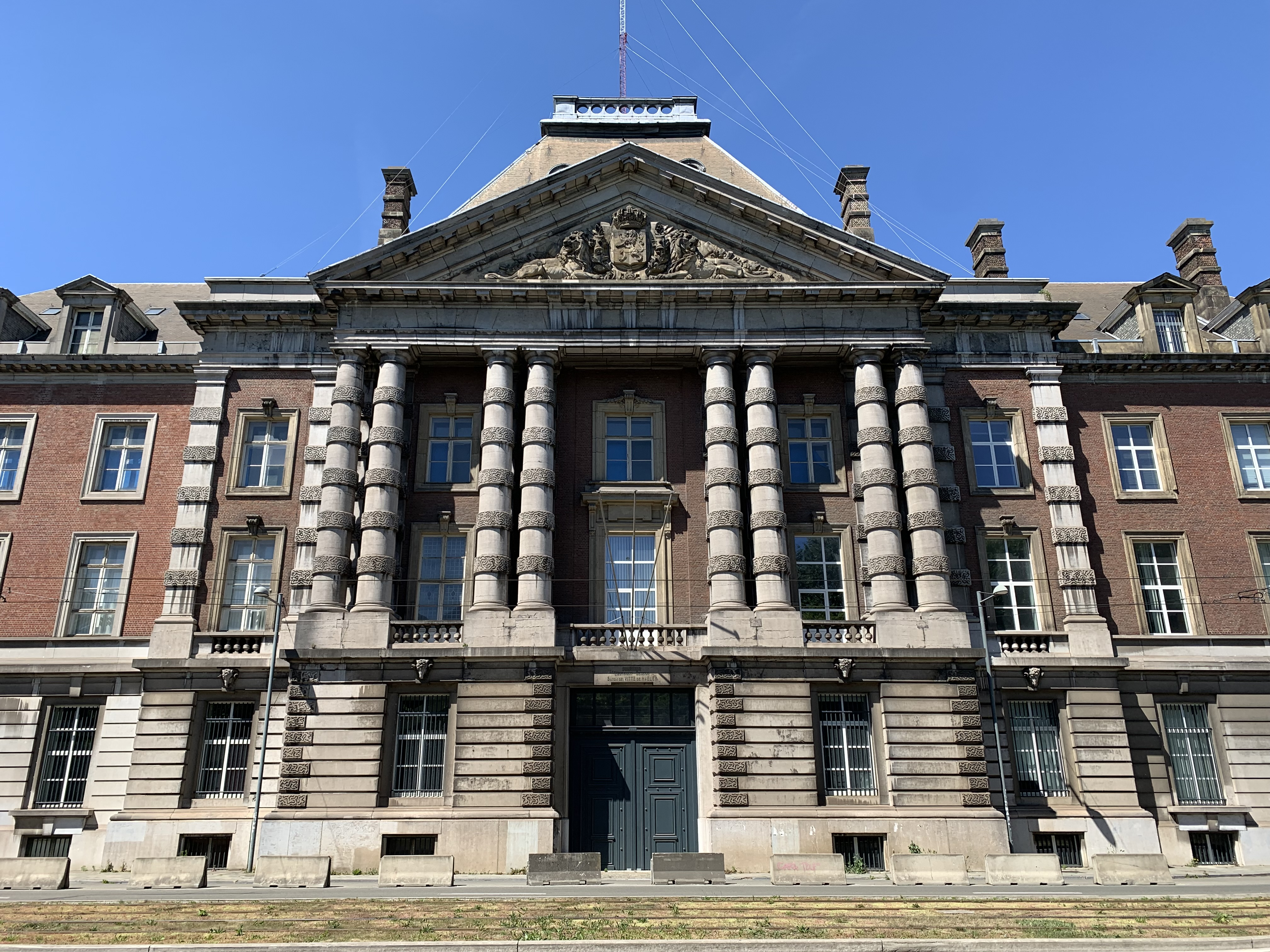
De Witte de Haelen Barracks on the Boulevard Général Jacques/Generaal Jacqueslaan

==== Saint-Pierre/Sint-Pieter ====
Located in the centre of Etterbeek.

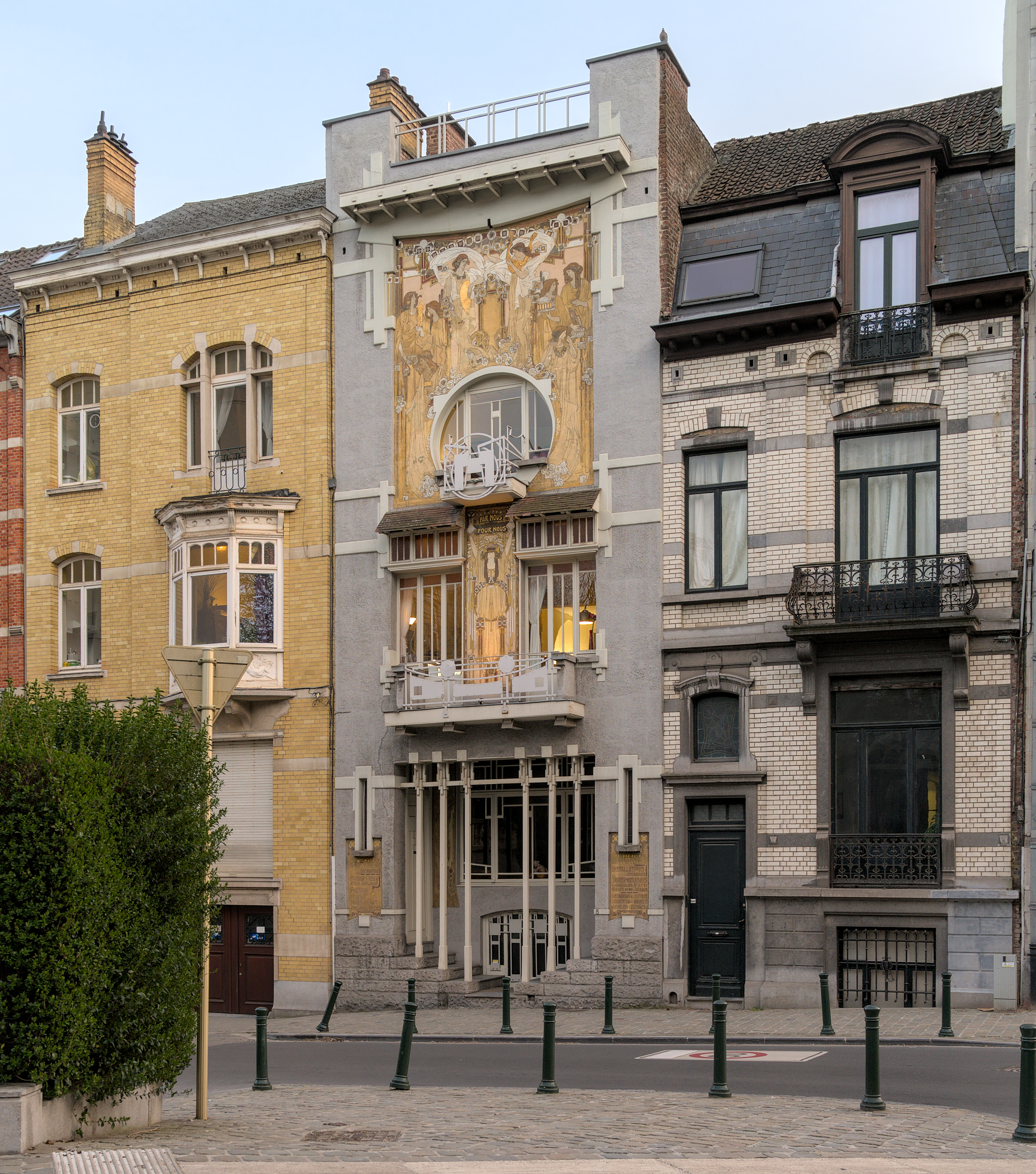
Cauchie House

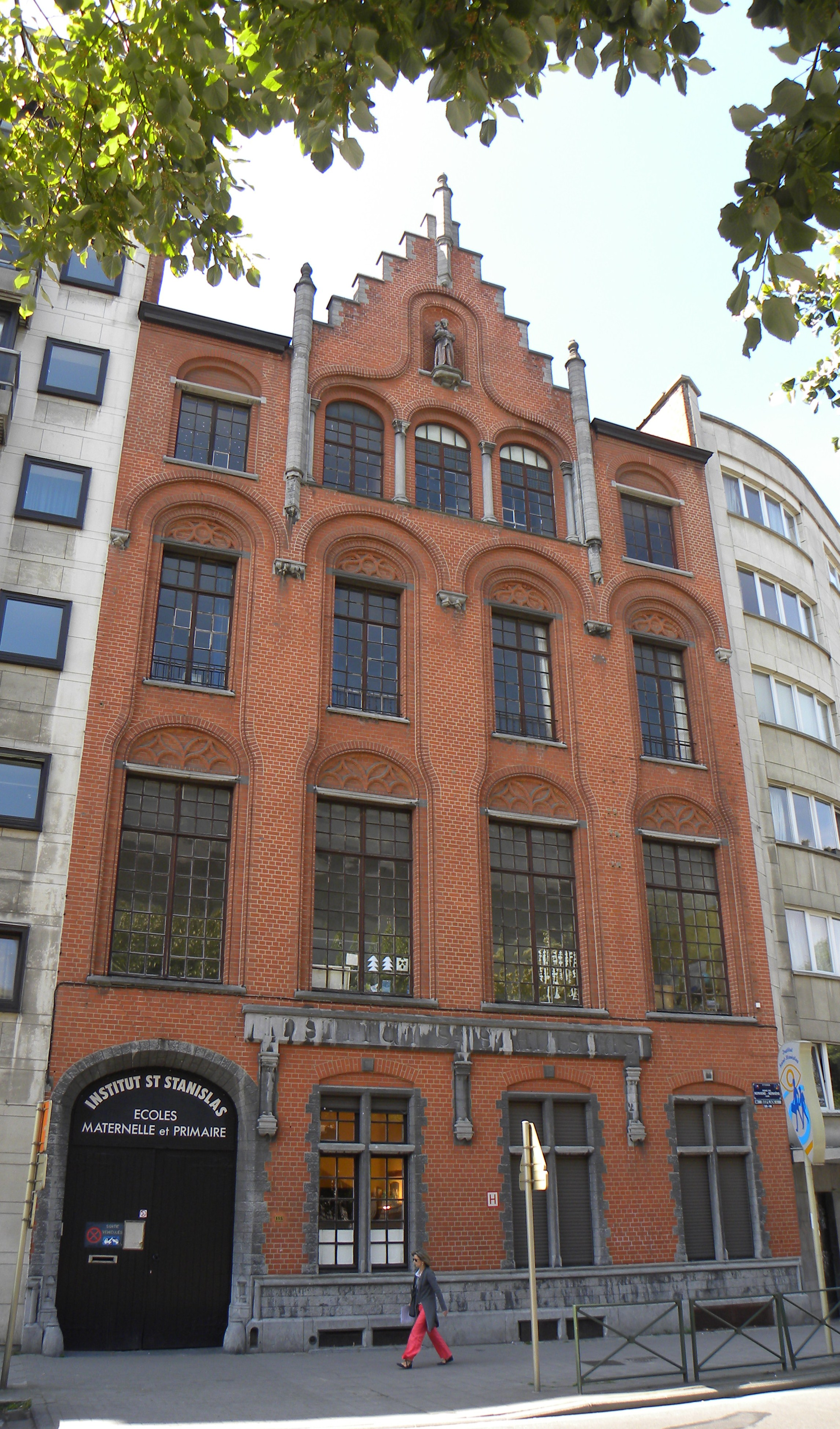
St. Stanislas Institute

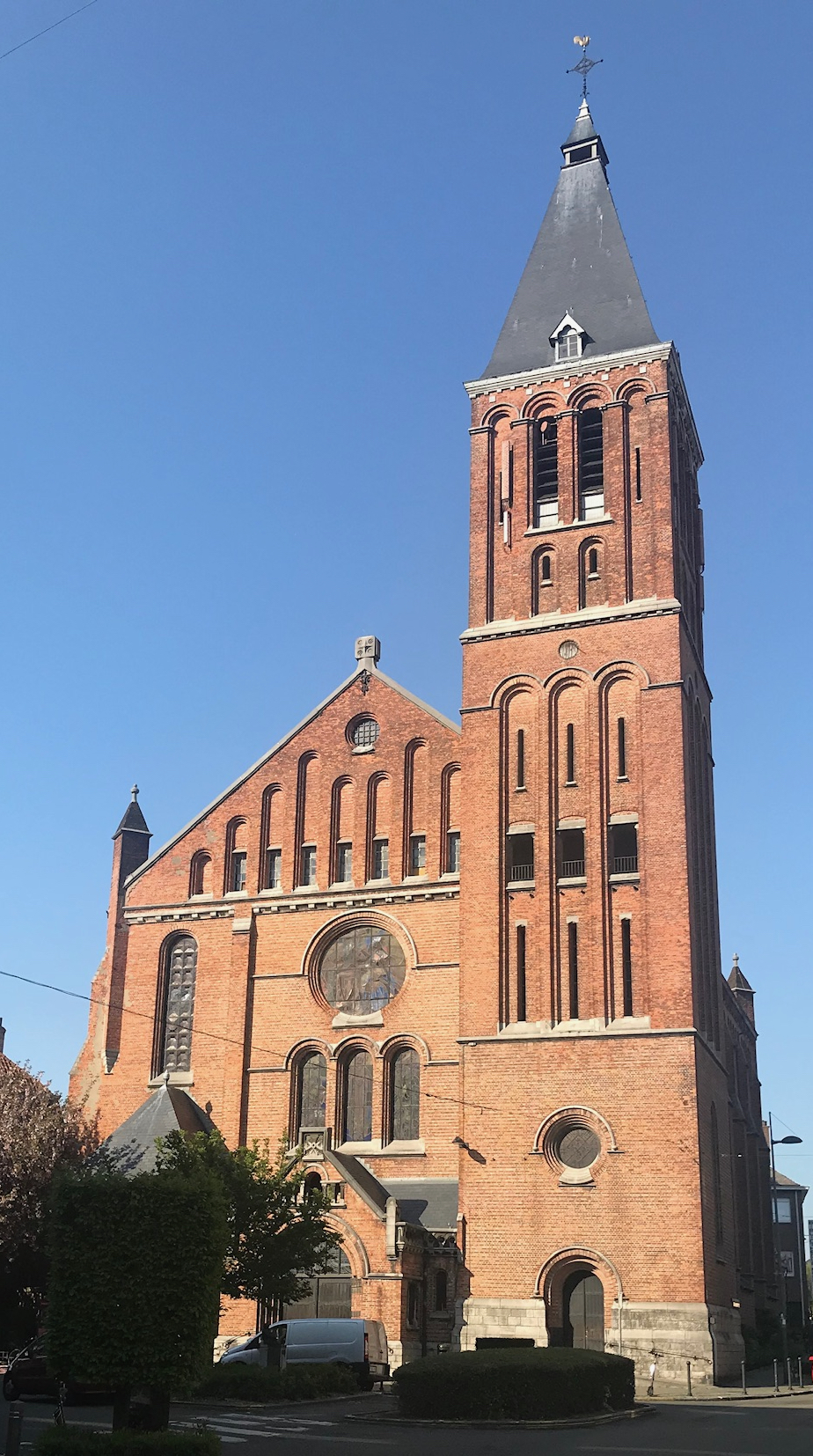
Church of Our Lady of the Sacred Heart

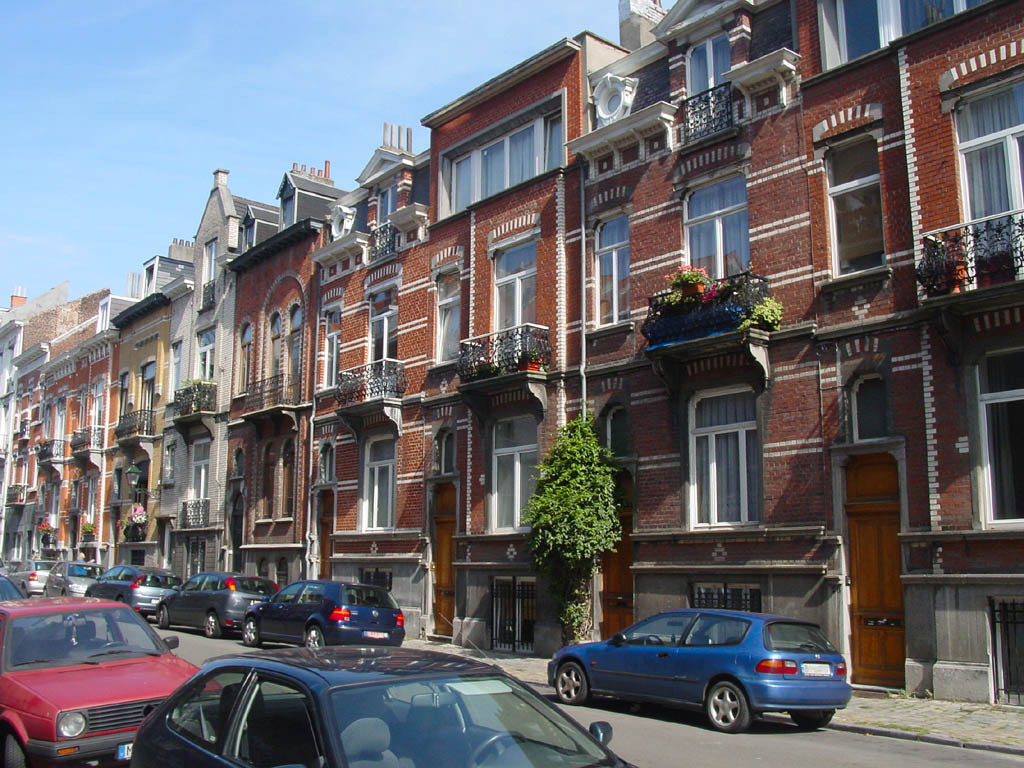
Rue des Boers/Boerenstraat

==== Saint-Michel/Sint-Michiel ====
Located in the east of Etterbeek, the Saint-Michel/Sint-Michiel district owes its name to St. Michael's College, a Jesuit college that has been located there since 1905. The neighbourhood, which is crossed by the boulevard of the same name, preserves an extraordinary heritage of Beaux-Arts-style mansions and town houses (generally built around 1920), as well as a few eclectic-style buildings.

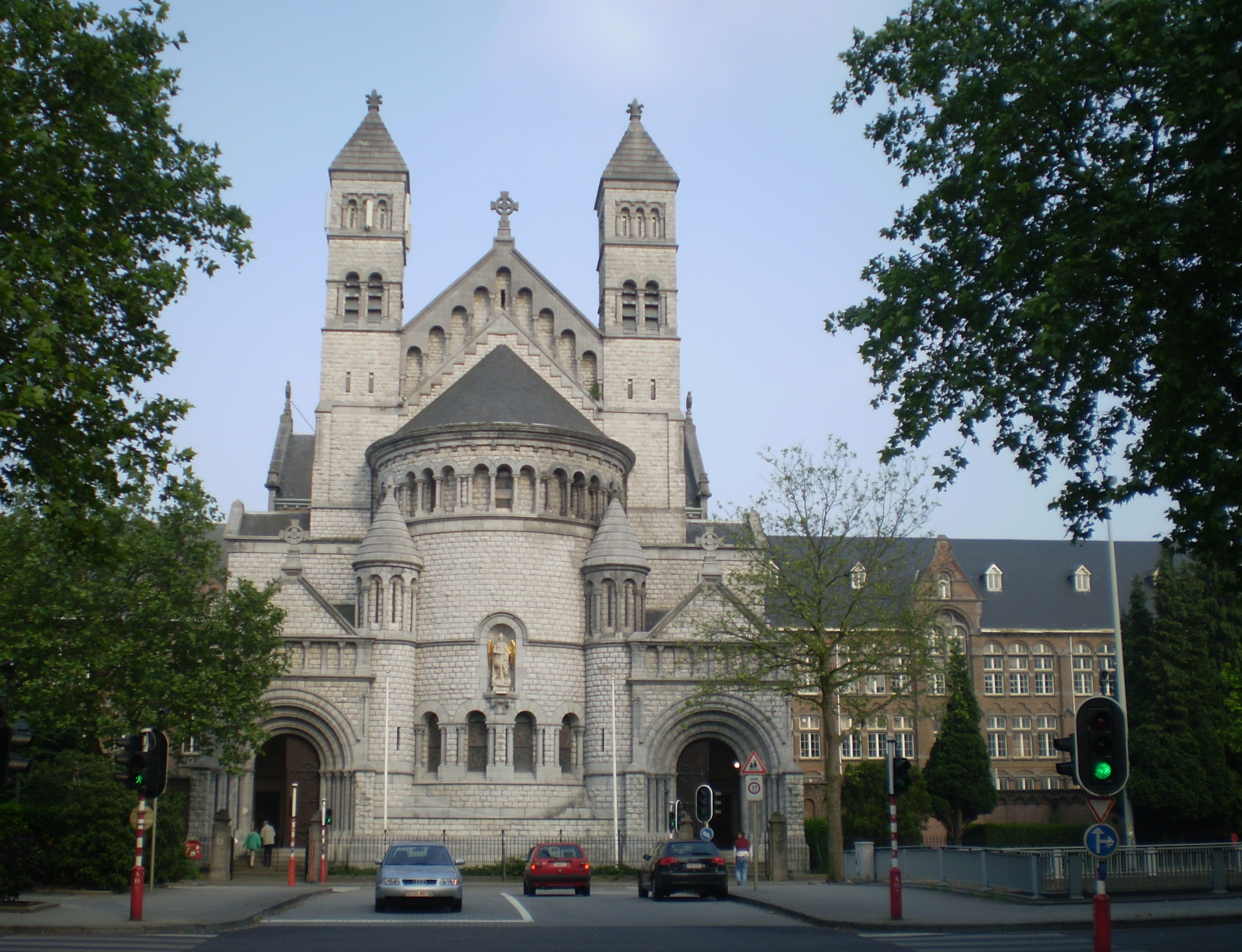
Church of St. John Berchmans and St. Michael's College

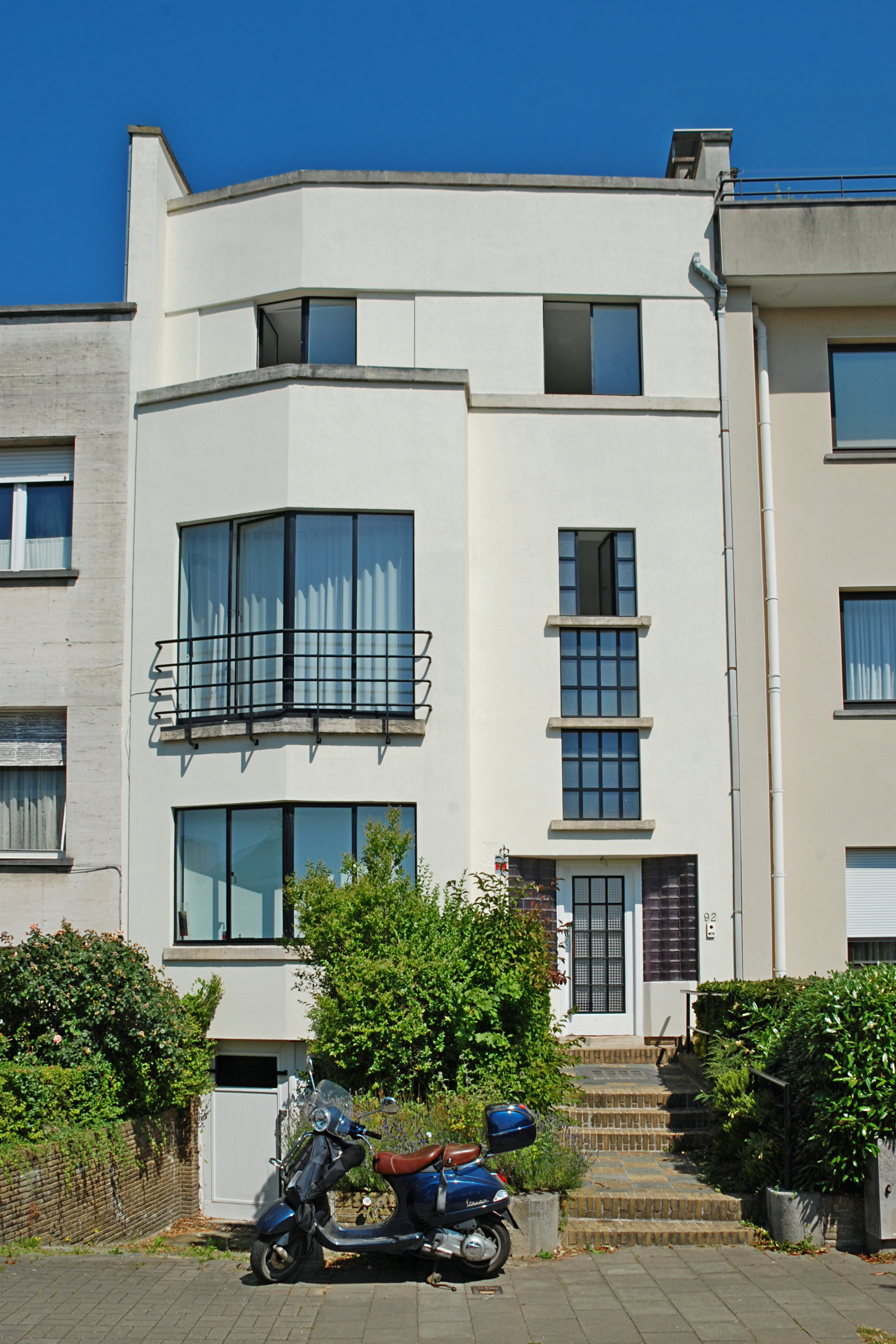
Borin House

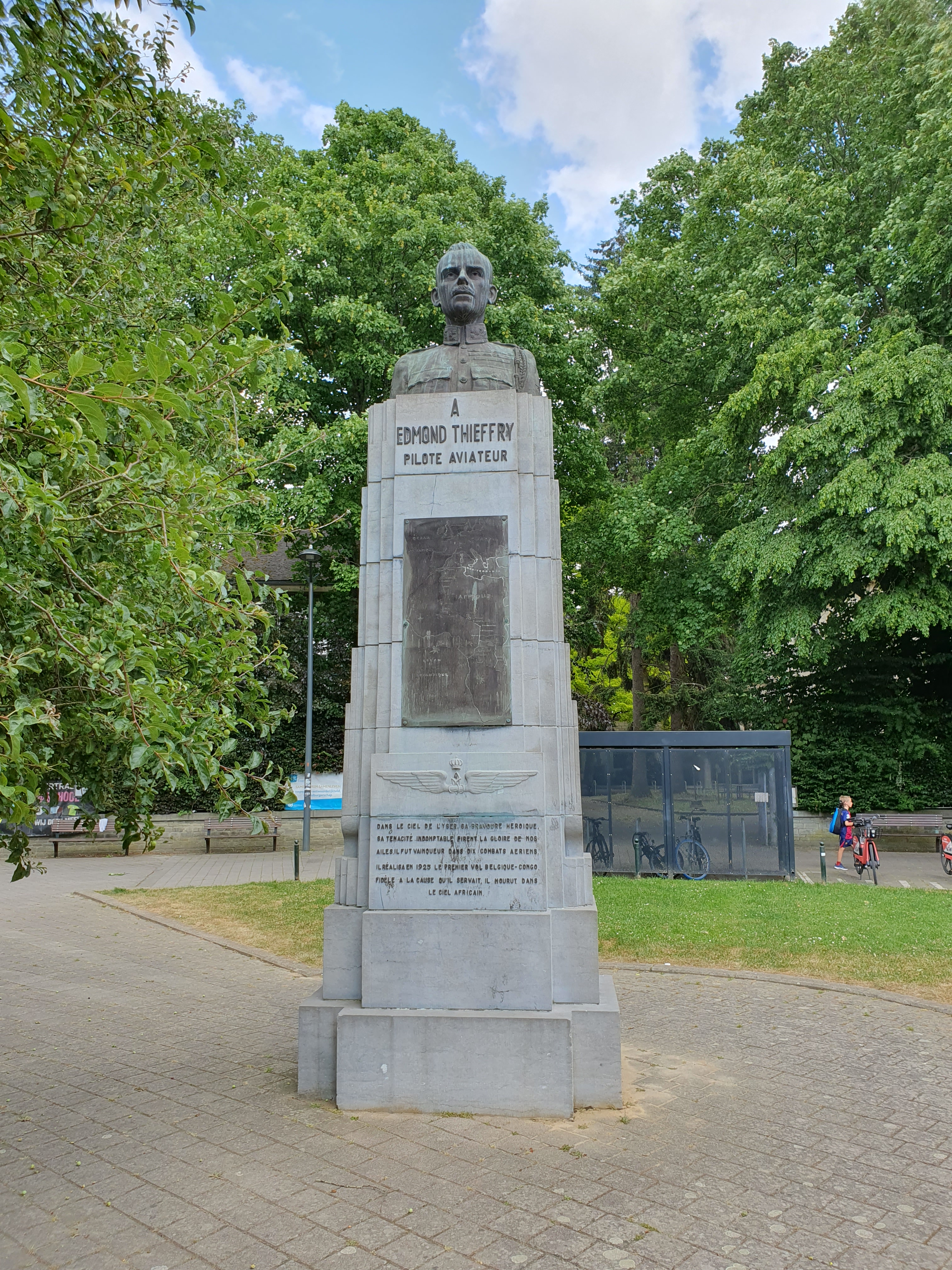
Avenue Boileau/Boileaulaan (Edmond Thieffry)

=== Evere ===
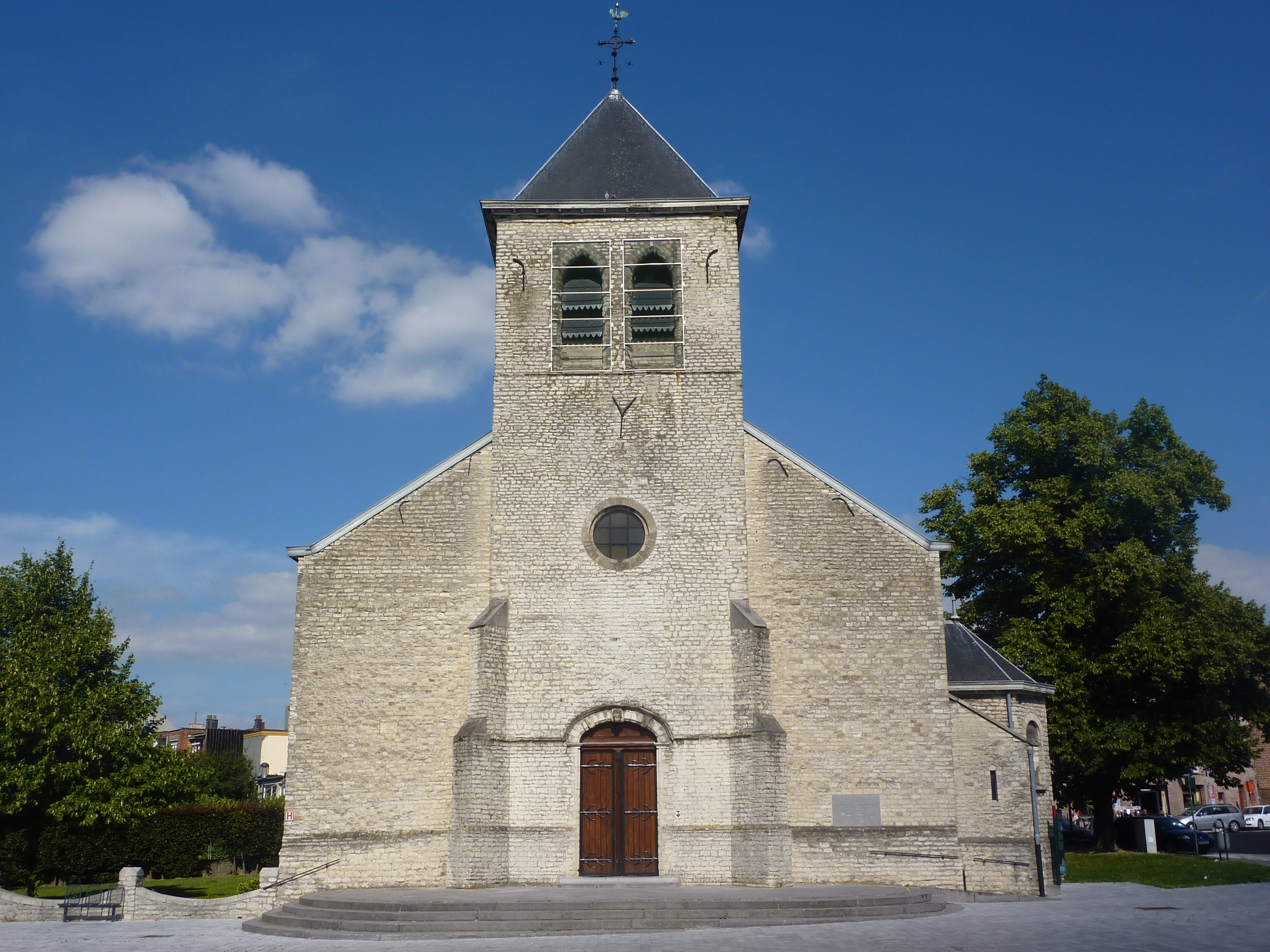
Church of St. Vincent

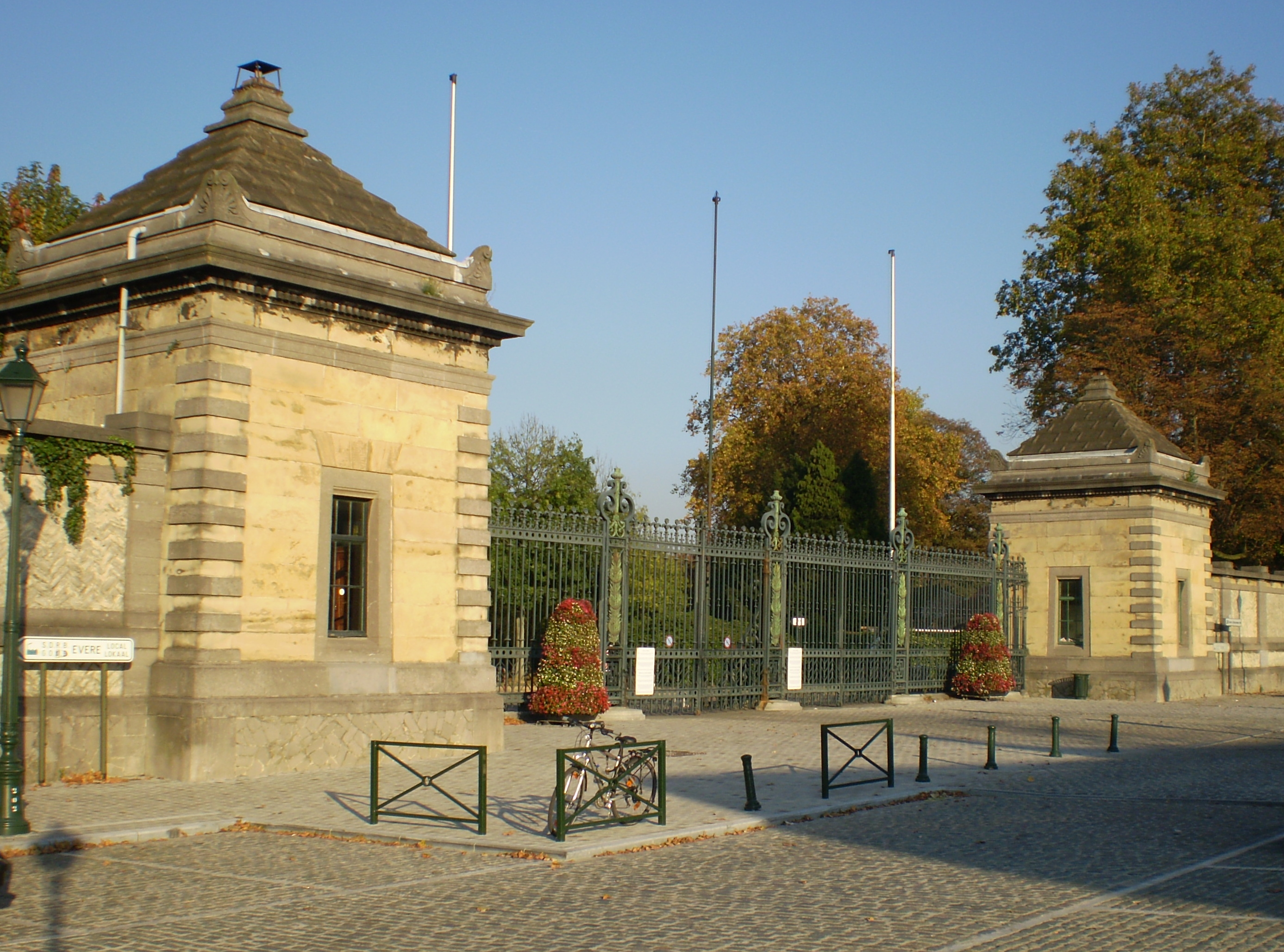
Brussels Cemetery

==== Conscience ====
Located in the centre of Evere.

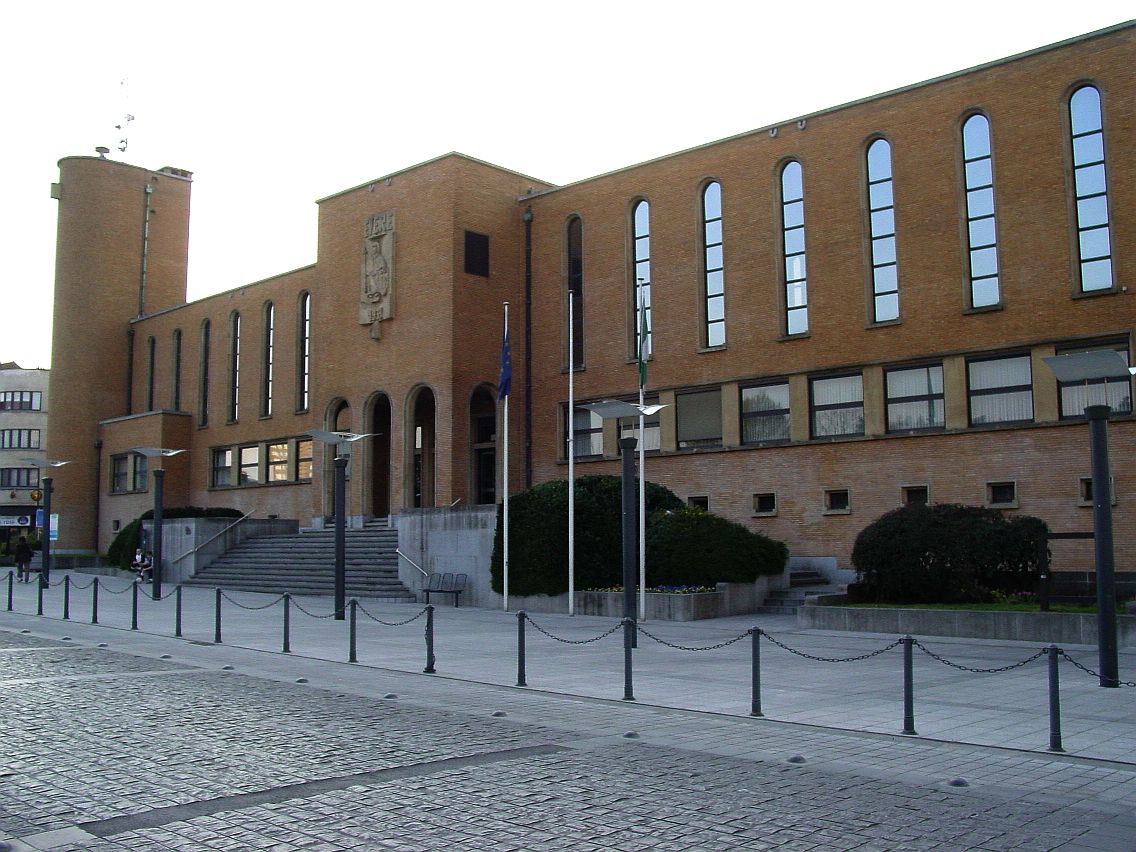
Evere's Municipal Hall

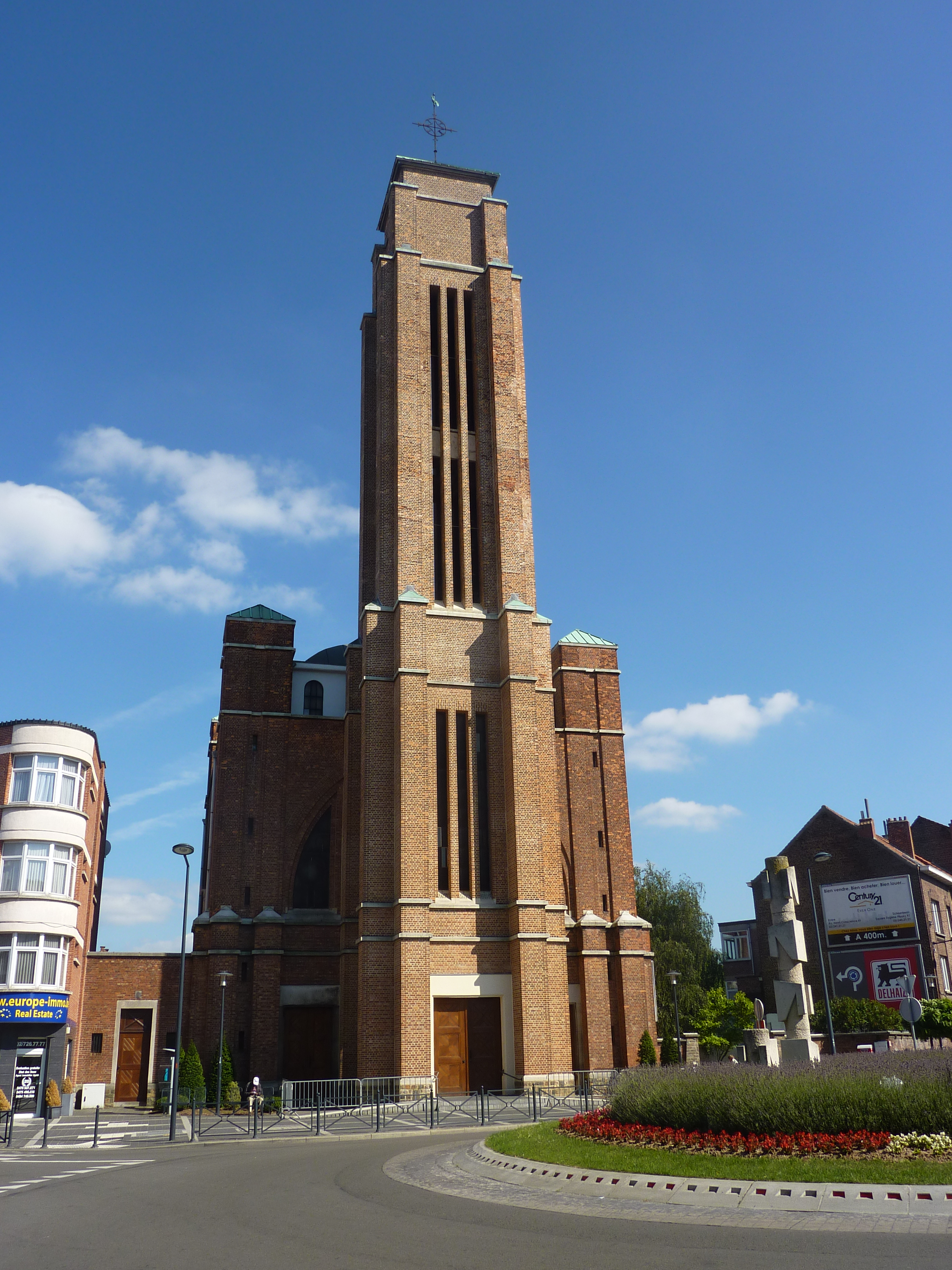
Church of Our Lady Immaculate Received

==== Picardie ====
Located in the north of Evere.

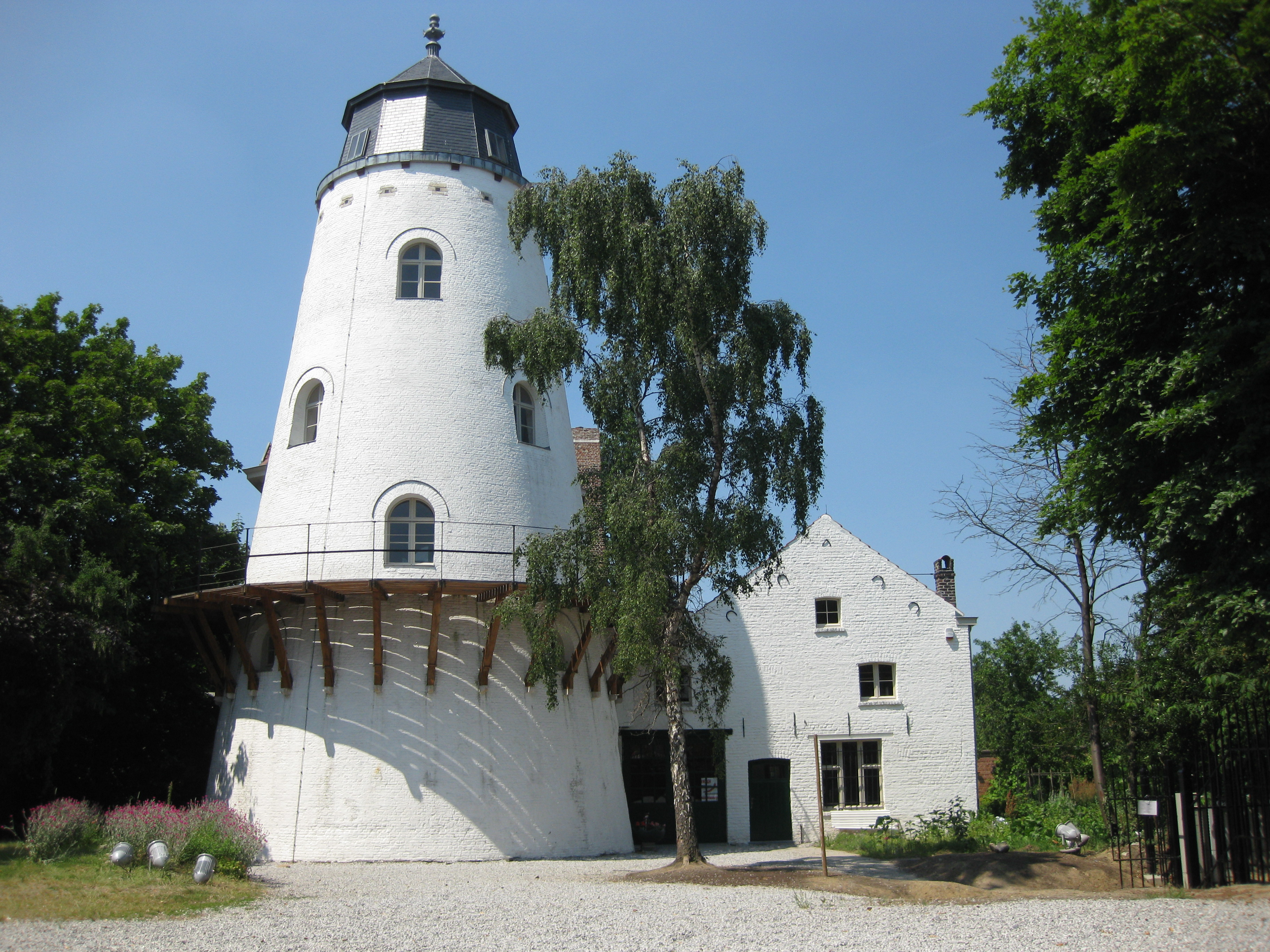
Former windmill at the Brussels Mill and Food Museum

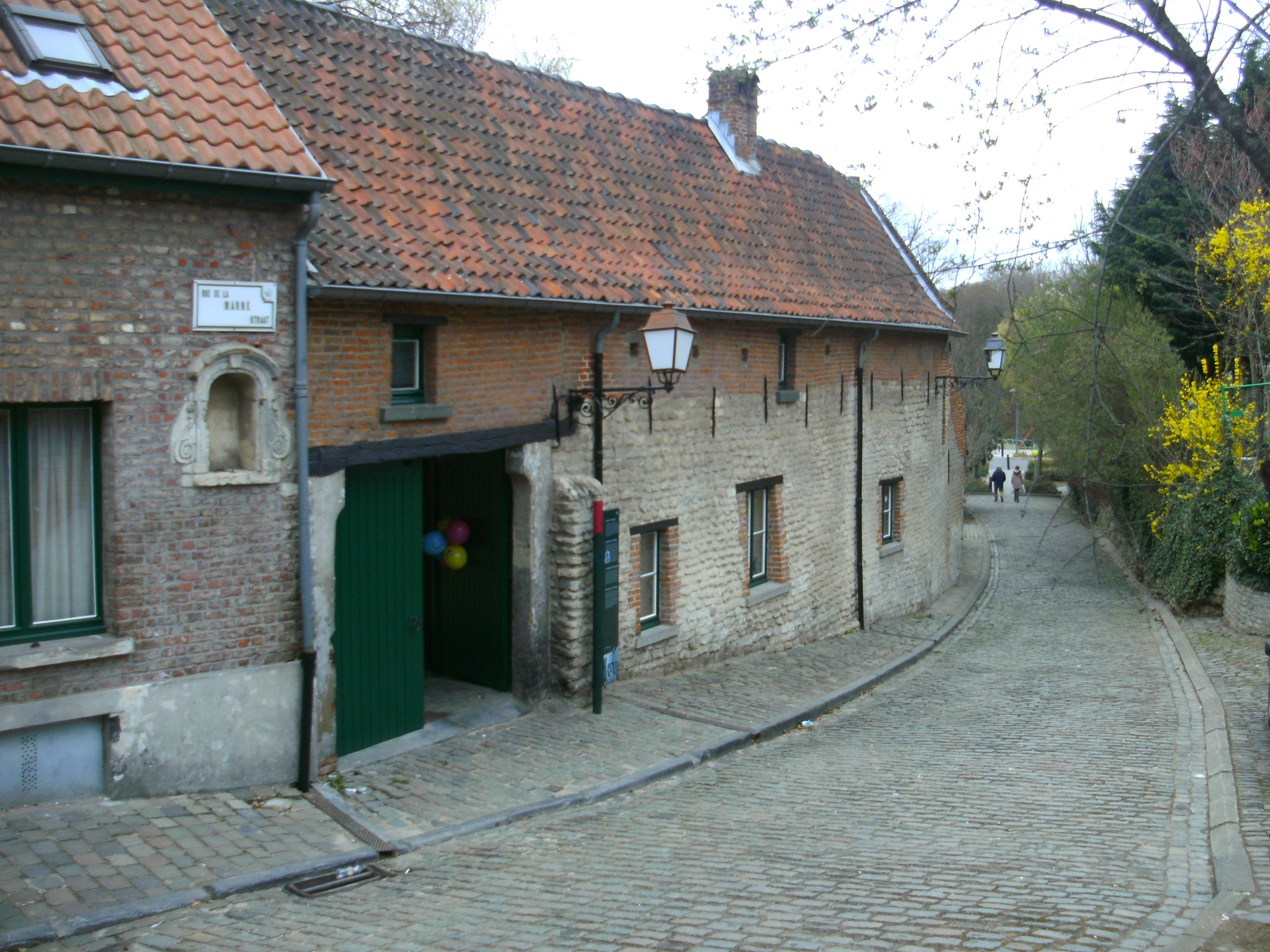
't Hoeveke

==== Germinal ====
Located in the centre of Evere.

==== Paduwa ====
Paduwa is located in the south of Evere, close to the municipalities of Schaerbeek and Woluwe-Saint-Lambert. In the centre of this district lies the Place Jean De Paduwa/Jan De Paduwaplaats, where the Church of St. Joseph is located.

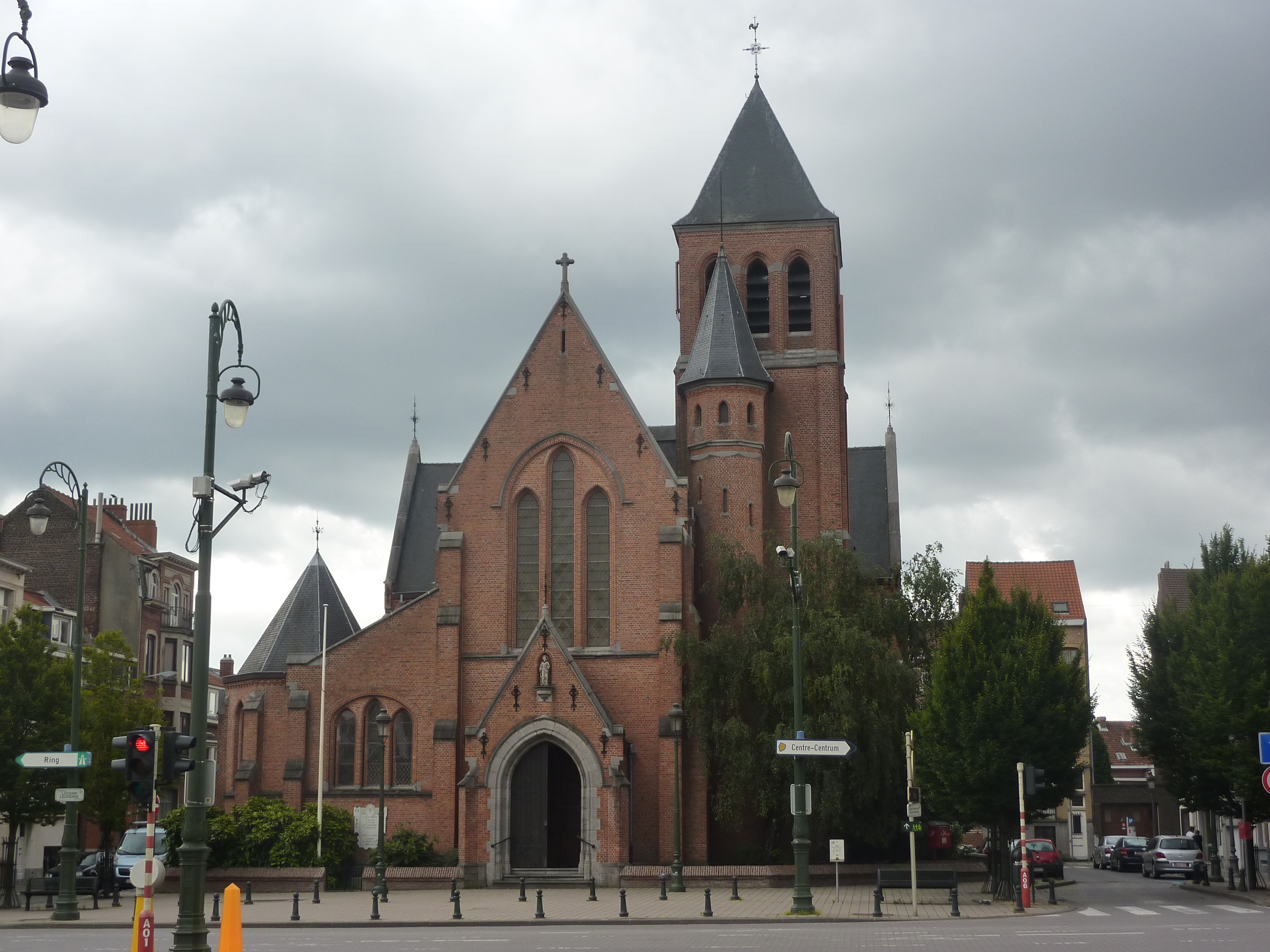
Church of St. Joseph

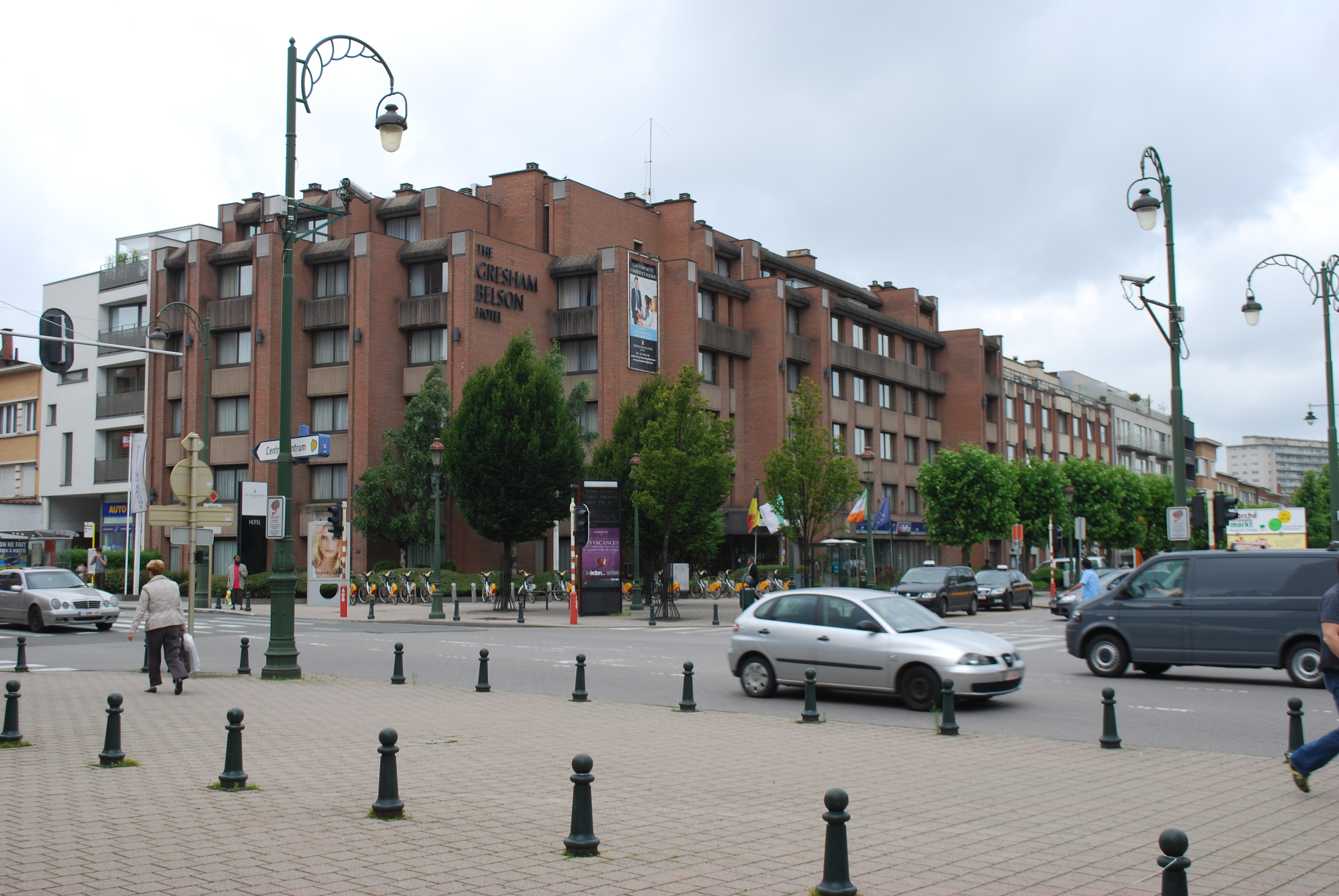
Place Jean De Paduwa/Jan De Paduwaplaats

=== Forest/Vorst ===
==== Altitude Cent/Hoogte Honderd ====
Located in the north-east of Forest, next to Duden Park, the district is so named because it occupies the summit of the Flotsenberg, the municipality's highest point, at an elevation of around 100 metres (330 ft) above sea level. Mostly developed in the early to mid-20th century, it combines eclectic, Art Nouveau and Art Deco houses with apartment blocks from the 1930s and later post-World War II additions. At its centre stands the circular Place de l'Altitude Cent/Hoogte Honderdplein, a roundabout around the Church of St. Augustine, from which eight of the district's major arteries radiate in a star-shaped plan.

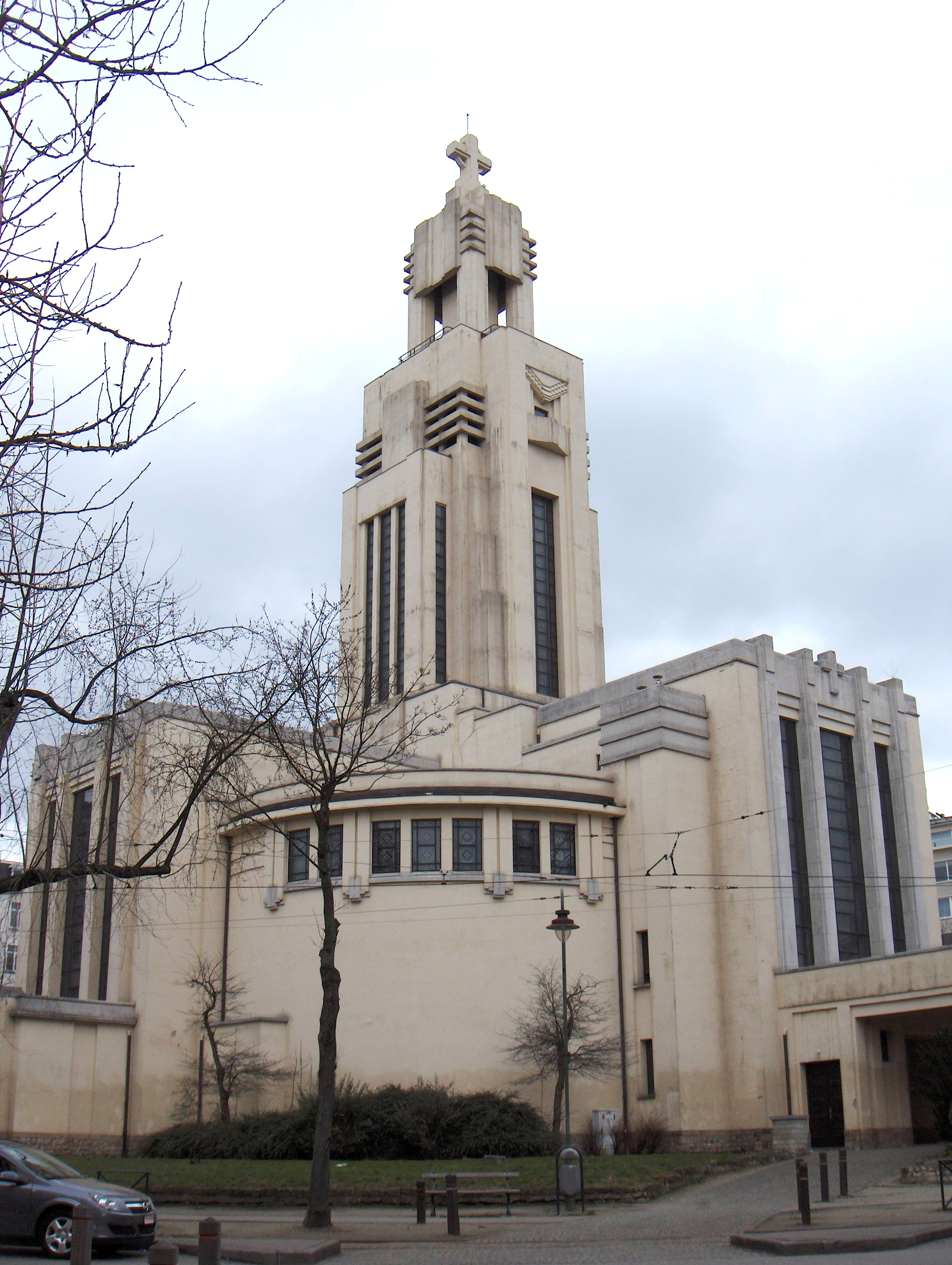
Church of St. Augustine

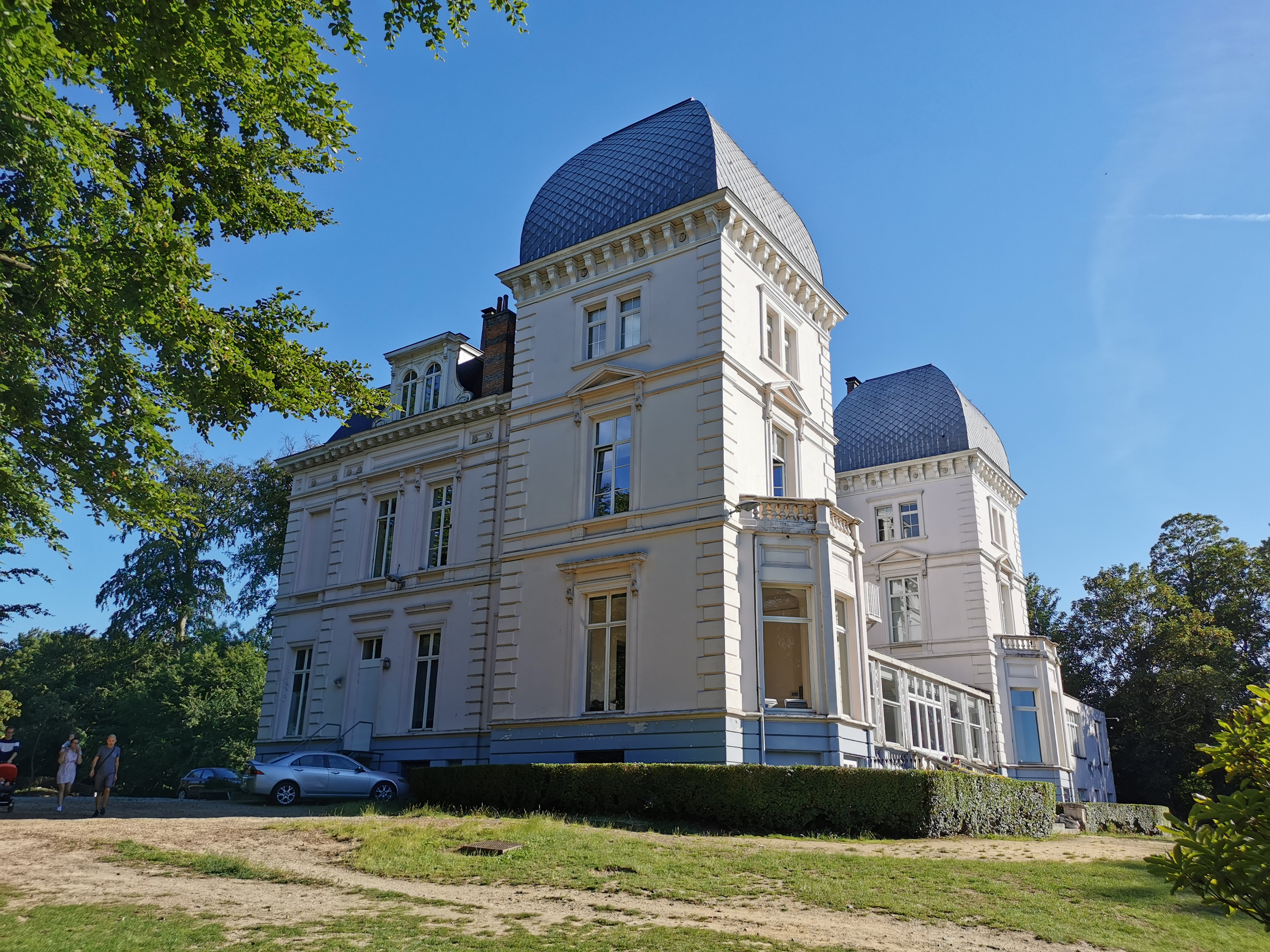
Duden Park château

==== Neerstalle (Saint-Denis/Sint-Denijs) ====
Neerstalle is located in the south of Forest, on the border with the municipality of Uccle. It used to be a hamlet on the Geleytsbeek, near the old hamlet and lordship of Stalle. In the 19th and especially the 20th century, the previously rural area became urbanised. The smaller Saint-Denis/Sint-Denijs district, close to the square of the same name, is more working-class and lively, and offers annual gatherings such as medieval festivals.

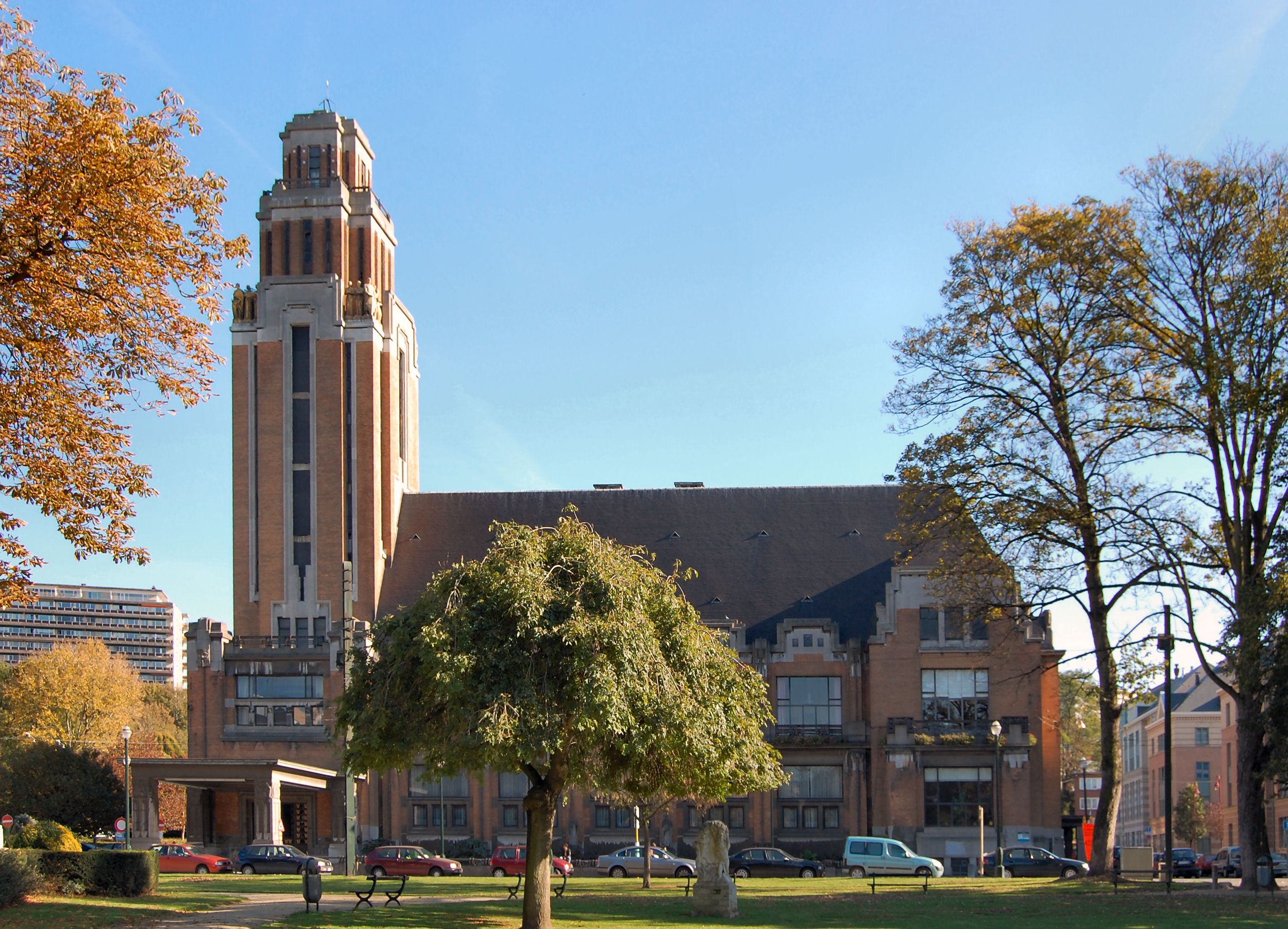
Forest's Municipal Hall

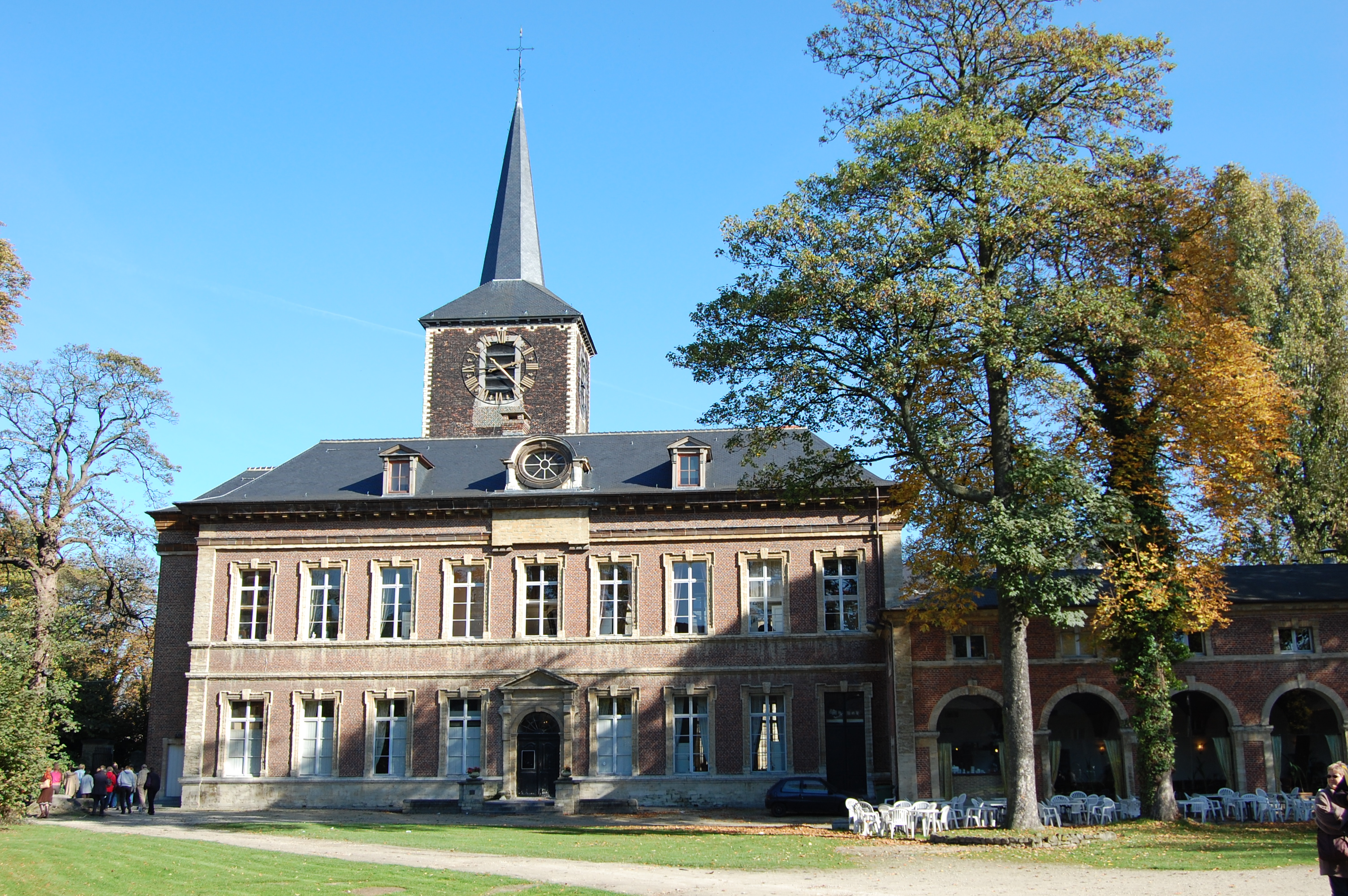
Forest Abbey

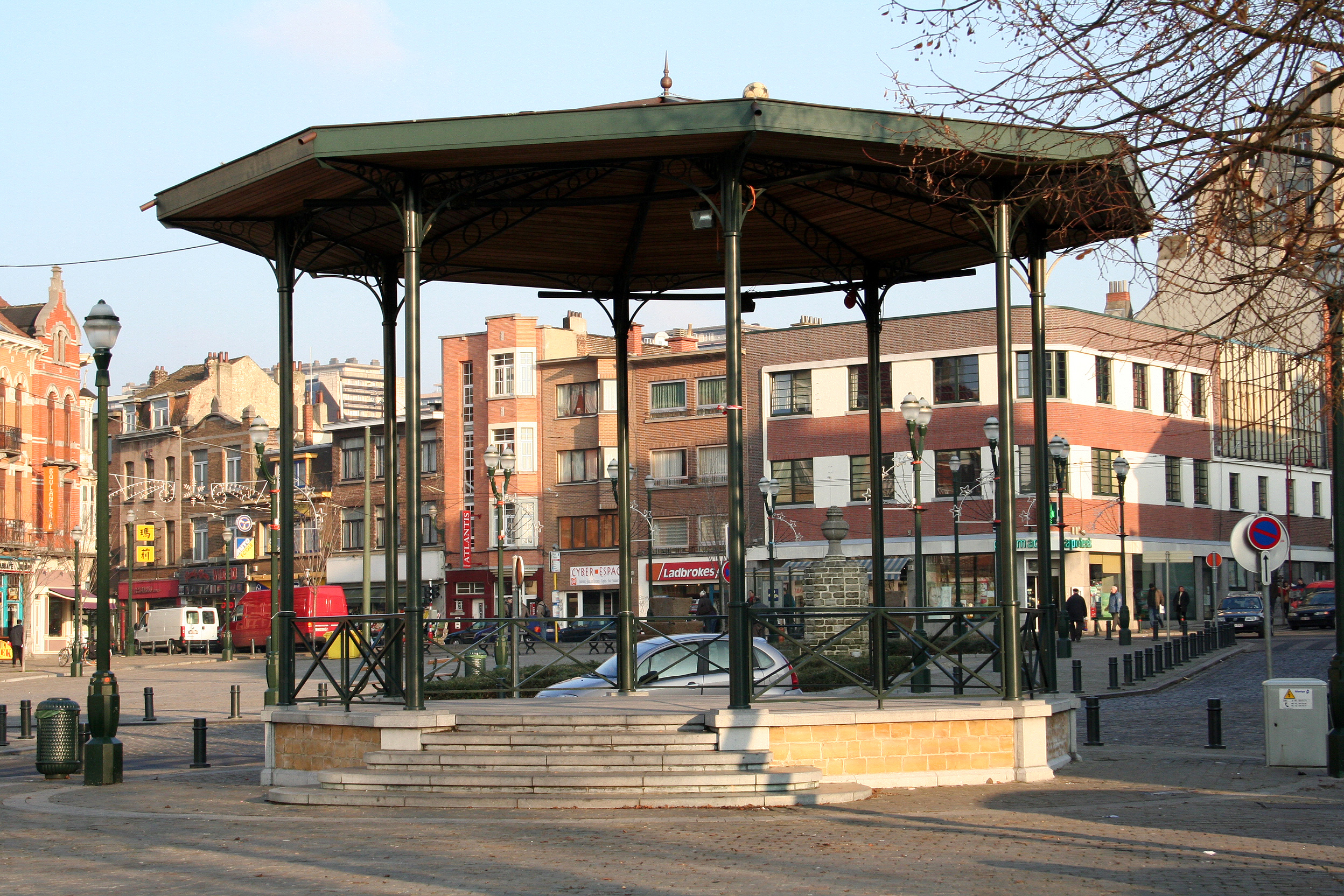
Place Saint-Denis/Sint-Denijsplein

==== Saint-Antoine/Sint-Antonius ====
Located in the north of Forest, around the Church of St. Anthony of Padua, and extending towards the Avenue Wielemans Ceuppens/Wielemans Ceuppenslaan and the Avenue du Roi/Koninglaan, the Saint-Antoine/Sint-Antonius district is a densely built, working-class area home to a largely immigrant population. It also includes several of the municipality's major cultural and recreational sites, notably the WIELS contemporary art centre, housed in the former Wielemans-Ceuppens brewery, as well as the BRASS cultural centre.

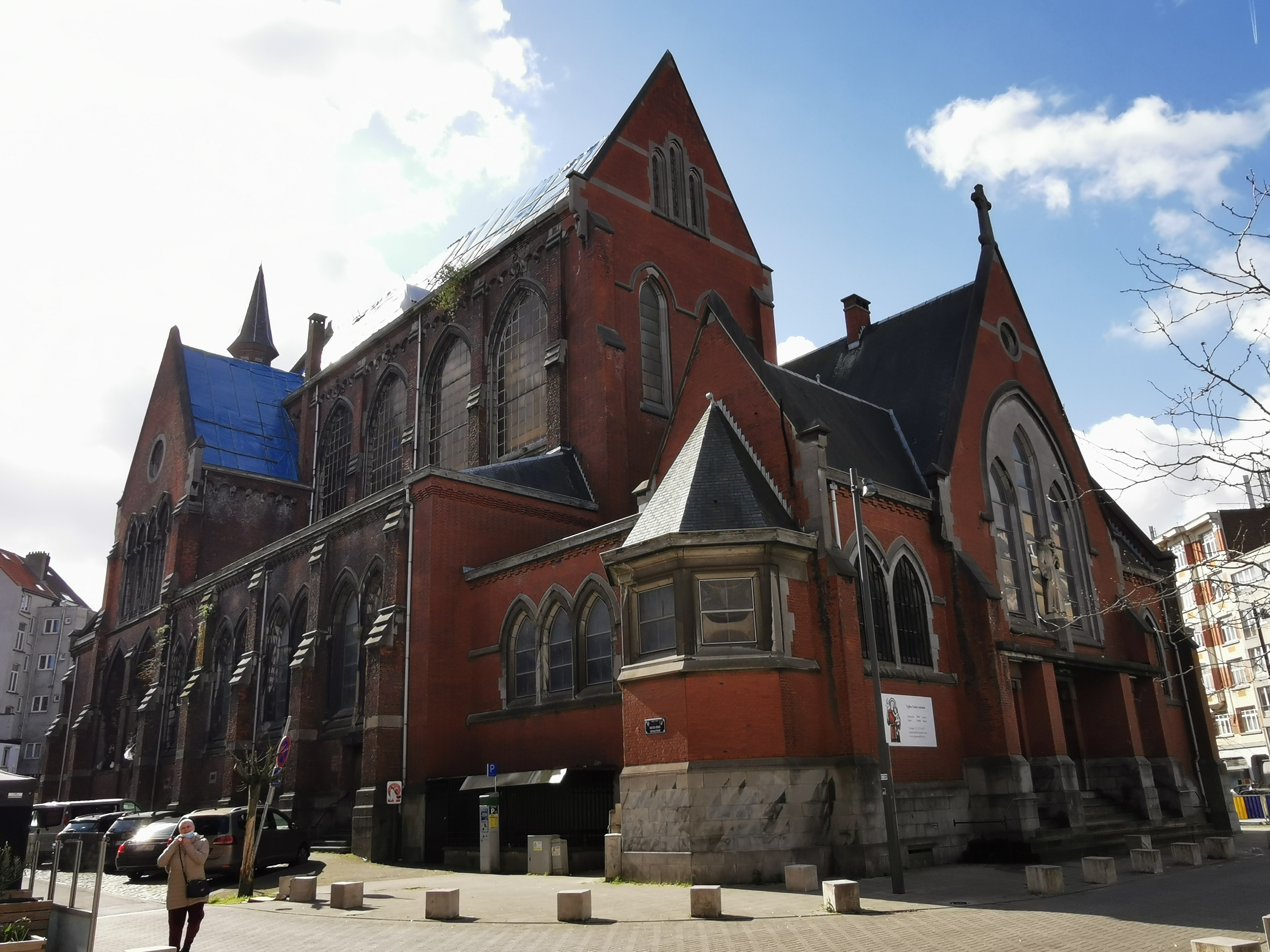
Church of St. Anthony of Padua

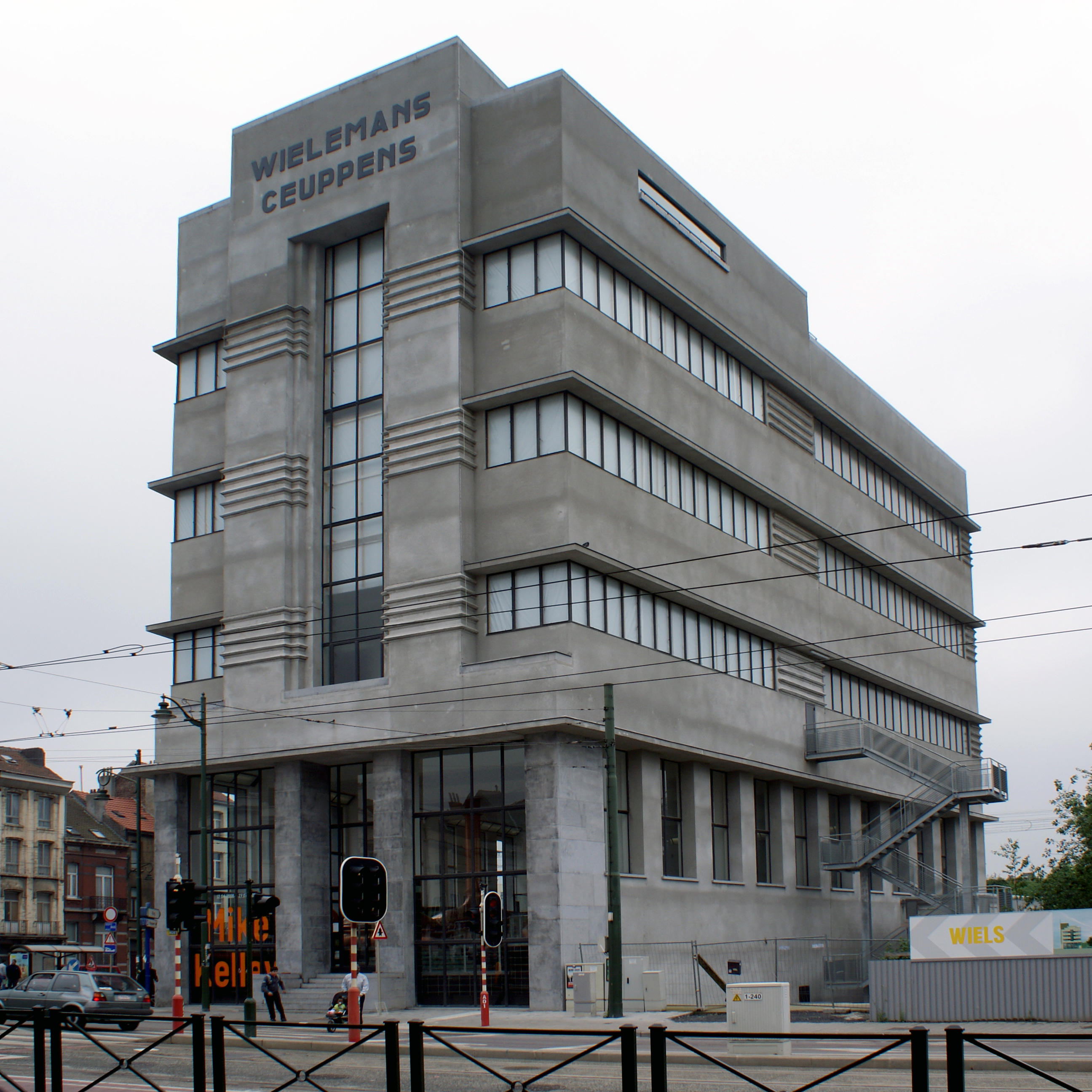
WIELS

BRASS

=== Ganshoren ===
==== Historical centre ====
The historical centre of Ganshoren is the municipality's central district.

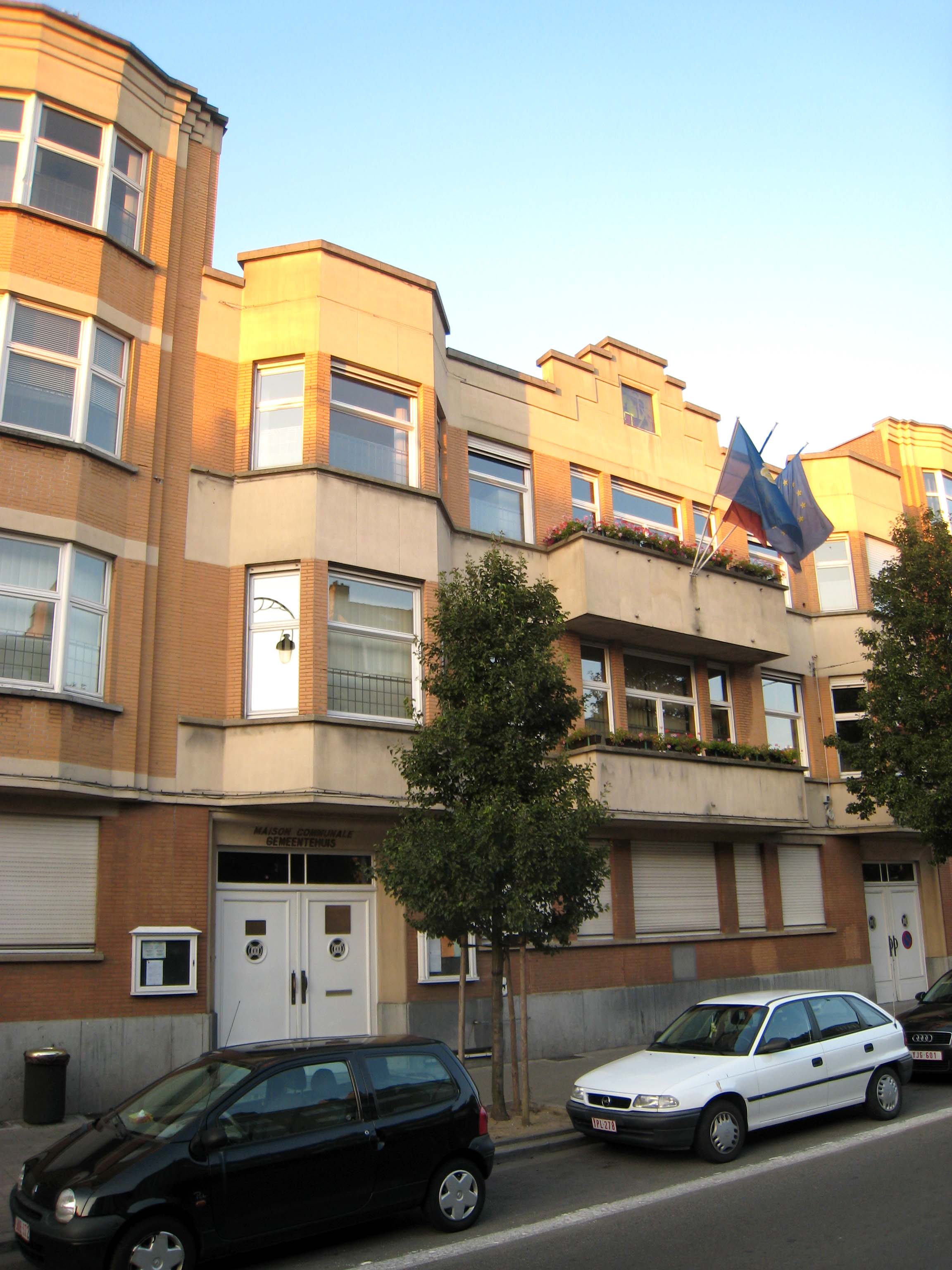
Ganshoren's Municipal Hall

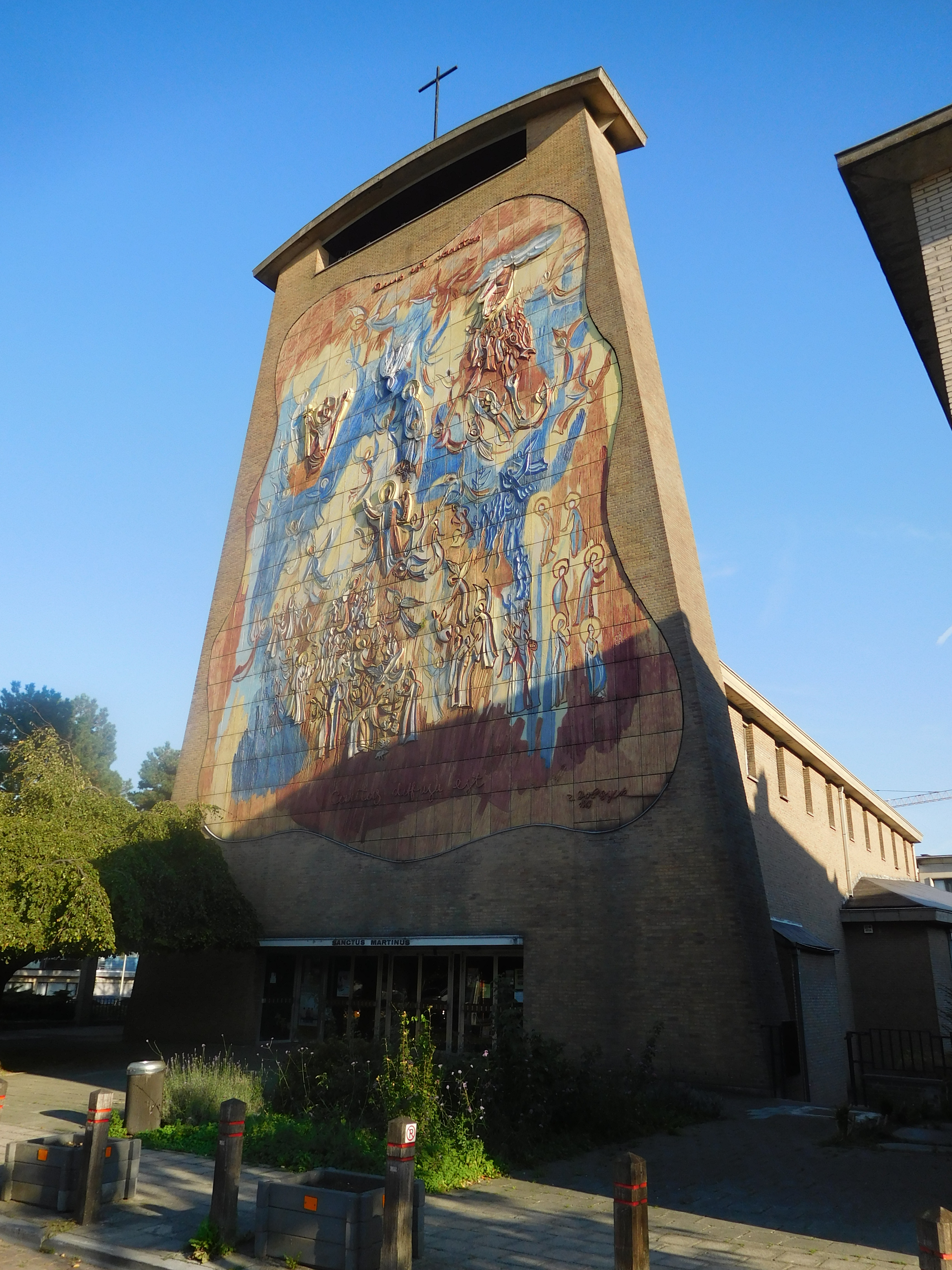
Church of St. Martin

==== Ganshoren Villas ====
Located in the north-west of Ganshoren, this star-shaped neighbourhood is centred around the section of the Avenue Van Overbeke/Van Overbekelaan located below the Liberté Roundabout. The district's name is paradoxical because the villas in question are large towers (about ten) of nearly twenty storeys, which represents nearly 120 apartments per building. The perimeter includes single-family social housing, in the Wagner and Neuberger estates and on the Avenue Maxe Smal/Maxe Smallaan.

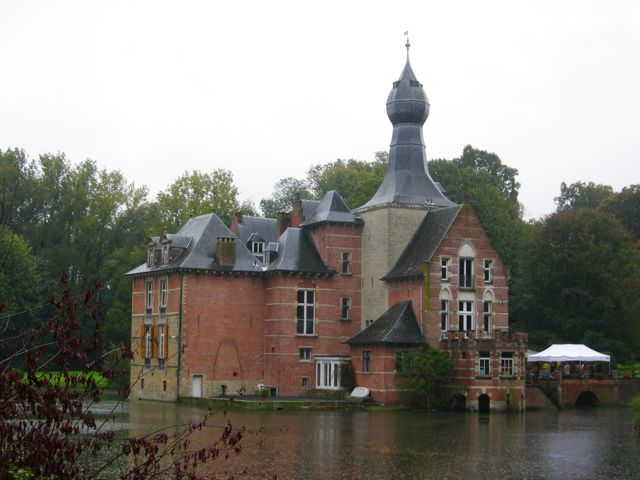
Rivieren Castle

==== Het Heideken ====
Located in the north-east of Ganshoren, Het Heideken is a social garden city designed by the architect Jules Ghobert and constructed between 1923 and 1925 on the site of former common land. The district is uniquely shaped like a butterfly or kite and stretches across both sides of the Avenue de l'Exposition Universelle/Wereldtentoonstellingslaan.

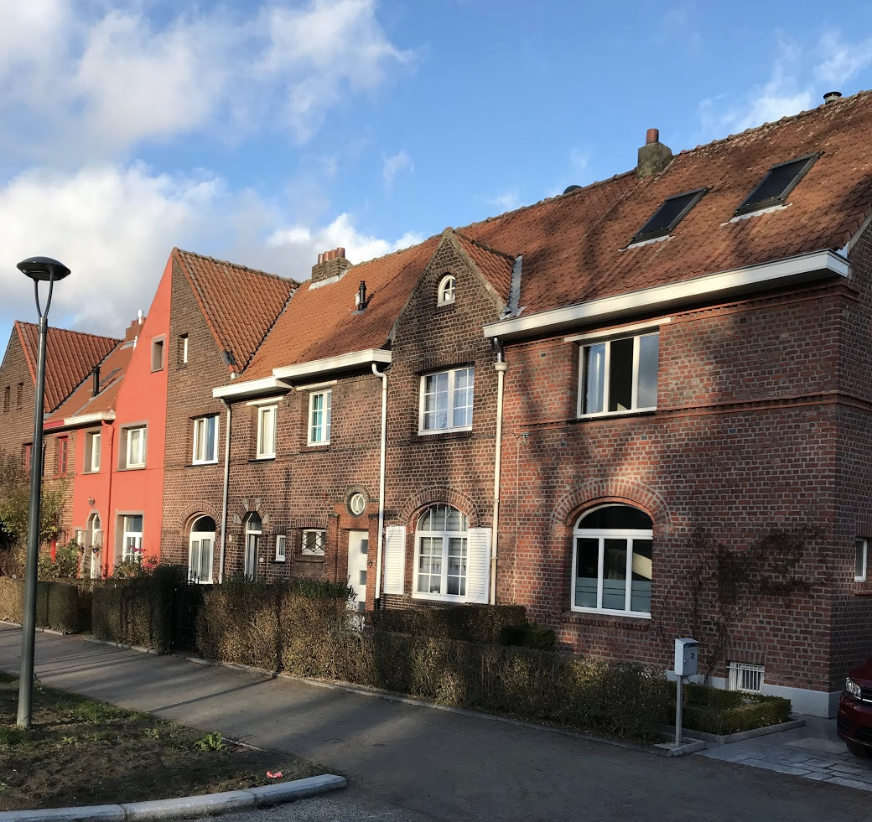
Square du Centenaire/Eeuwfeestsquare

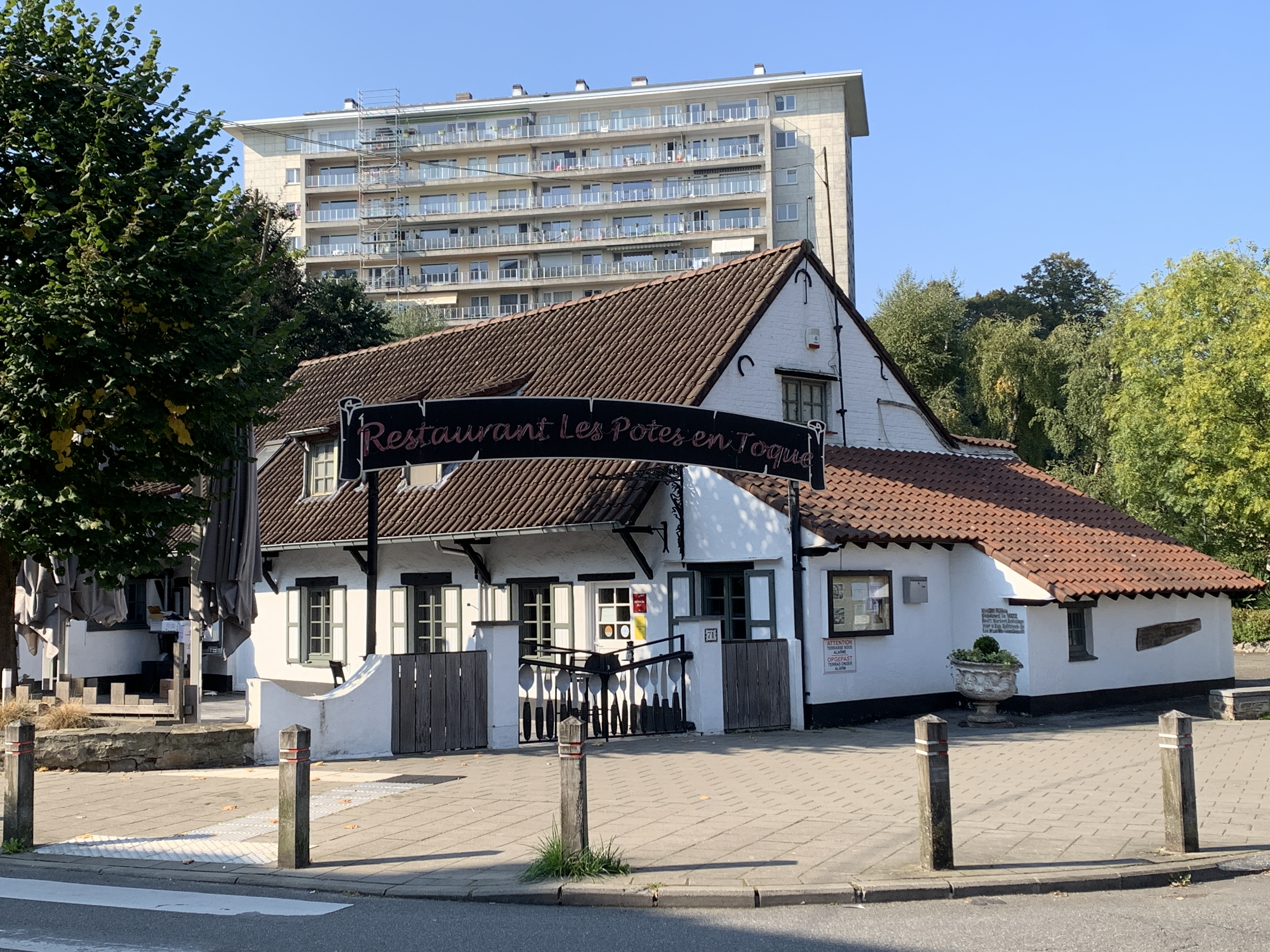
Les Potes en Toque

=== Ixelles/Elsene ===
==== Namur Gate (Matonge) ====
Located in the north of Ixelles.

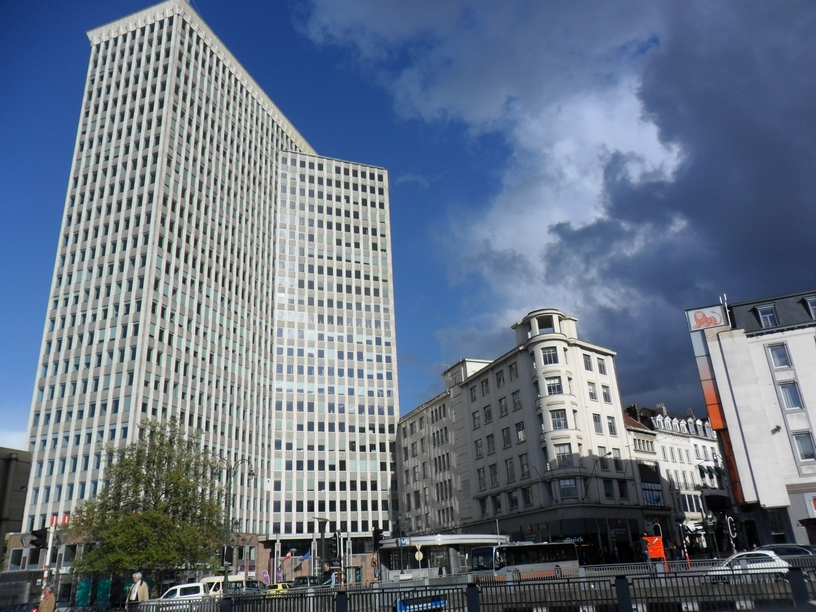
Bastion Tower at the Namur Gate

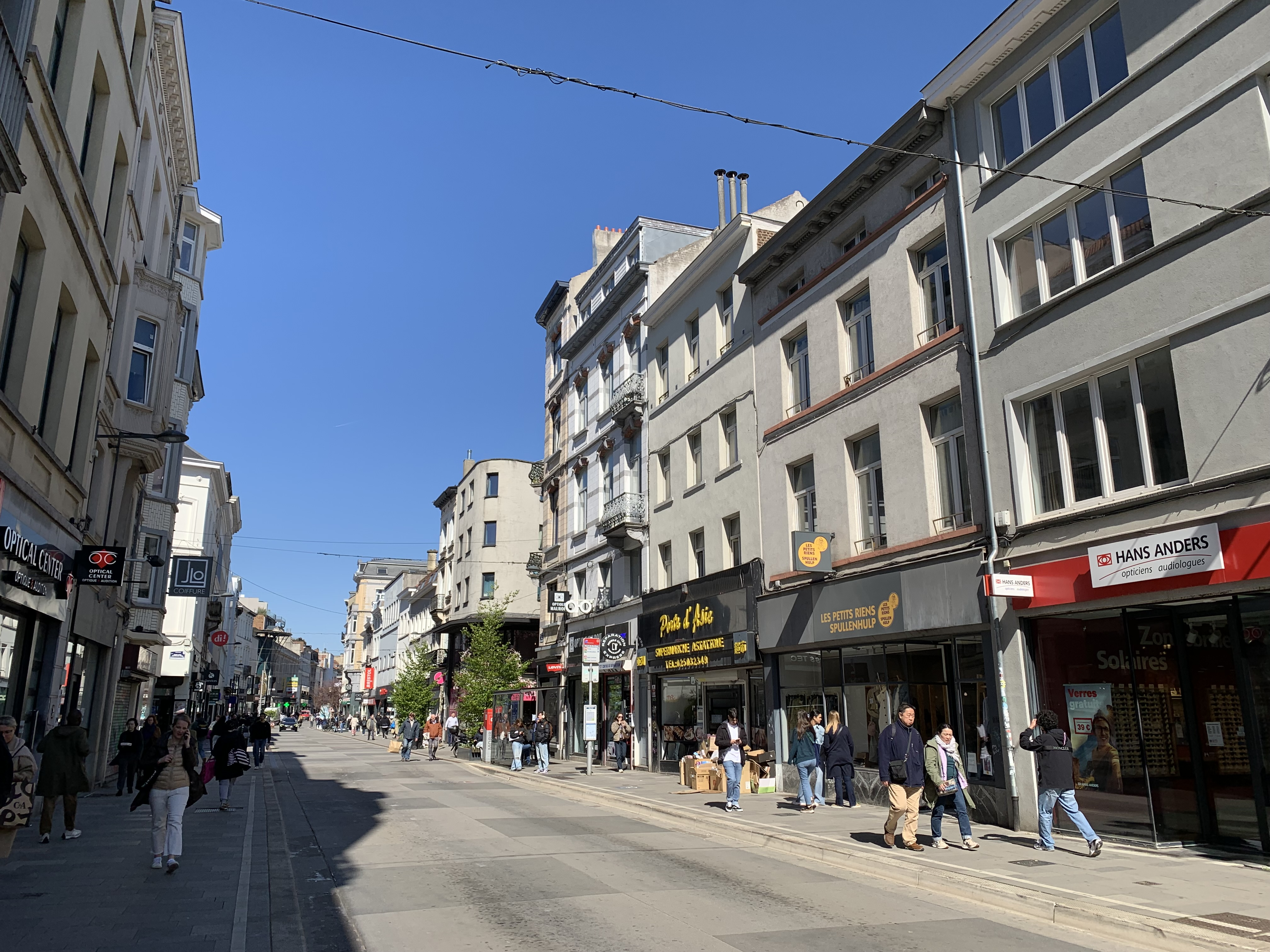
Chaussée d'Ixelles/Elsensesteenweg

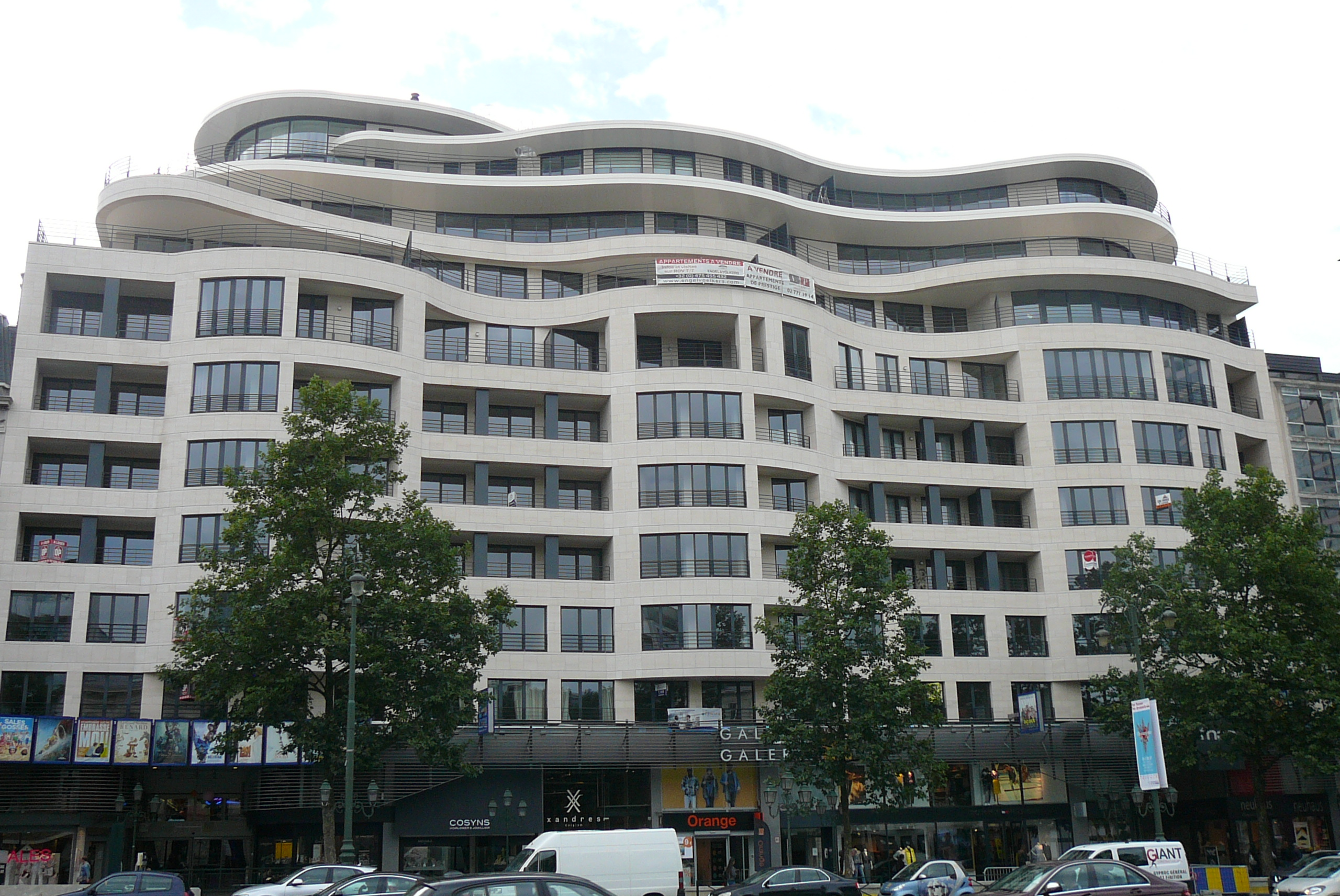
Toison d'Or Gallery on the Avenue de la Toison d'Or/Gulden-Vlieslaan

==== Saint-Boniface/Sint-Bonifatius ====
Located in the north of Ixelles.

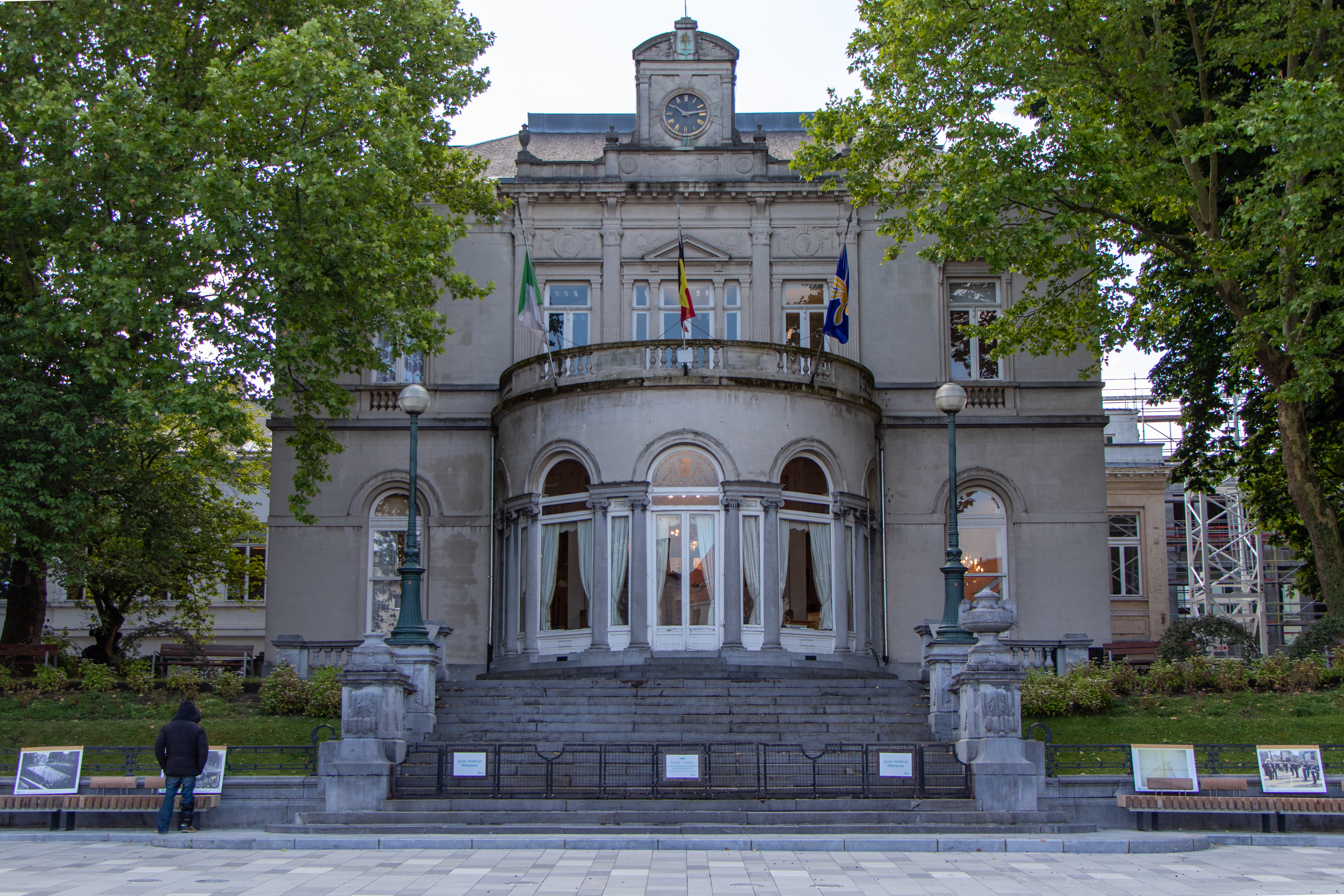
Ixelles' Municipal Hall

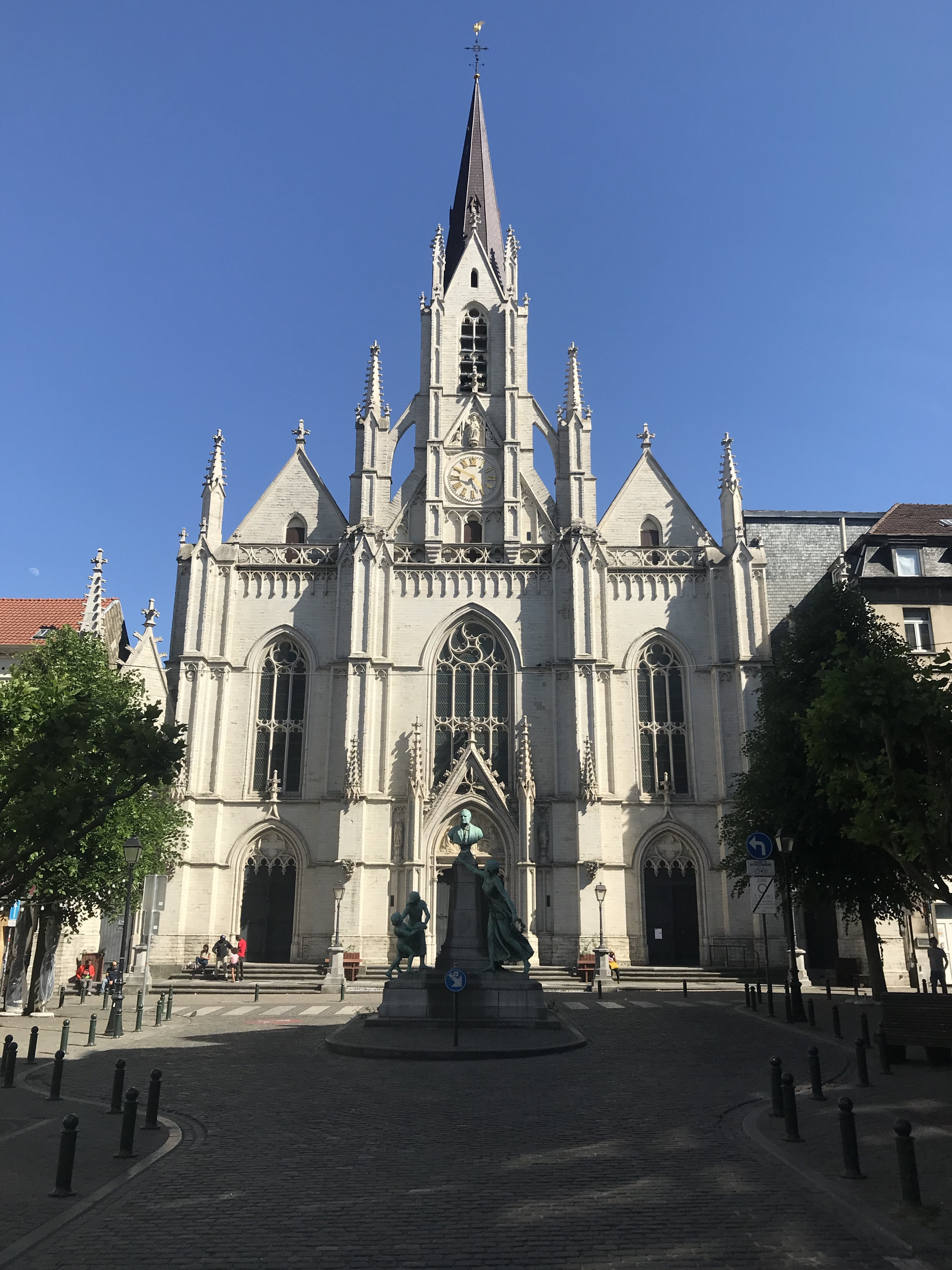
Church of St. Boniface

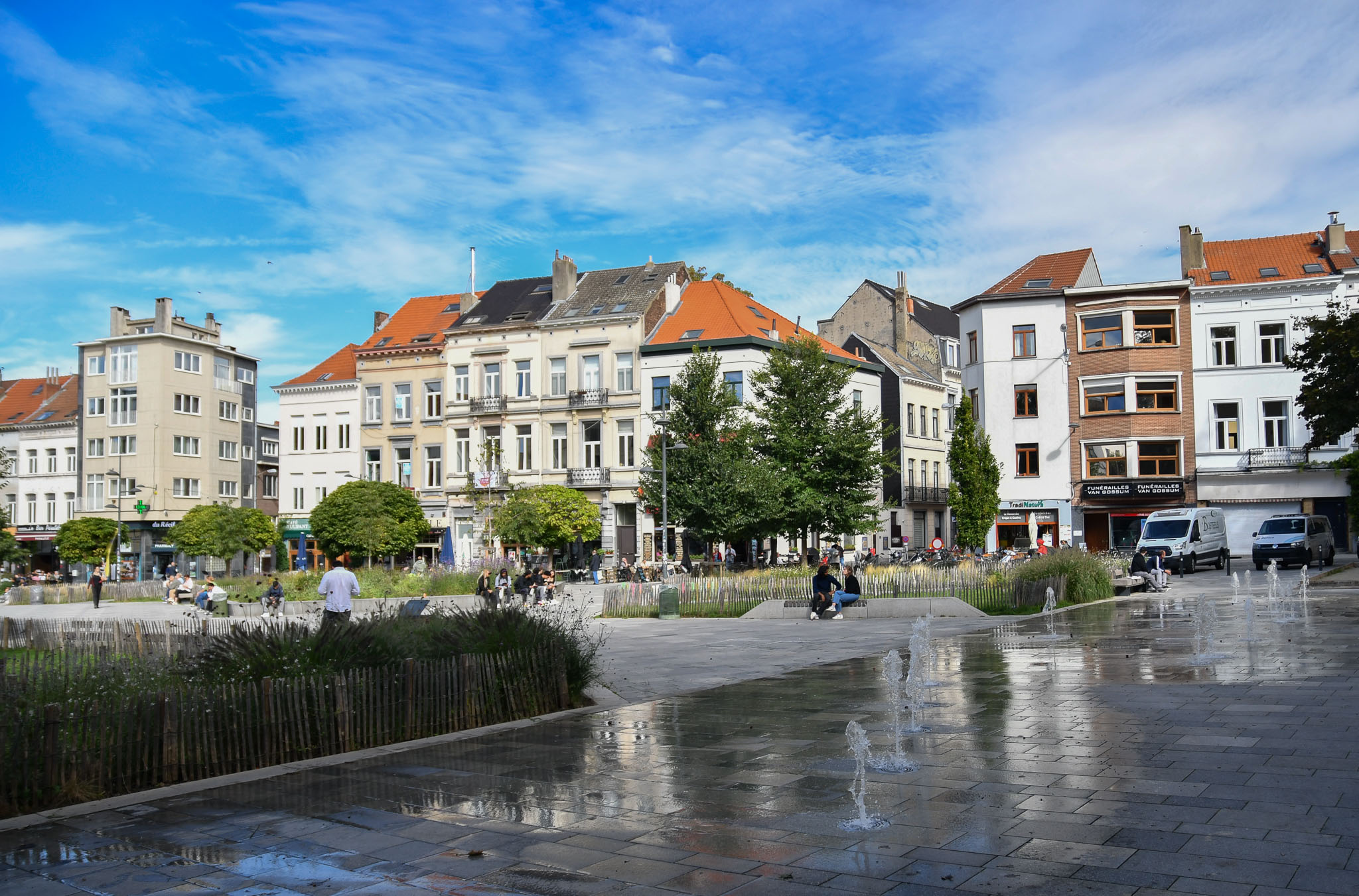
Place Fernand Cocq/Fernand Cocqplein

==== Flagey (Malibran) ====
Located in the centre of Ixelles, around the Place Eugène Flagey/Eugène Flageyplein, this district includes the Cité de l'Aulne, the smaller Malibran and Gray districts, as well as several cultural sites. The former headquarters of the Belgian National Institute of Radio Broadcasting (INR/NIR) has been converted into a cultural centre, largely financed by the Flemish Community; the Place Flagey is also home to the French-language architecture school La Cambre. The district also has a Portuguese community among its diverse immigrant population, which is conspicuous because of the Pessoa monument and bars.

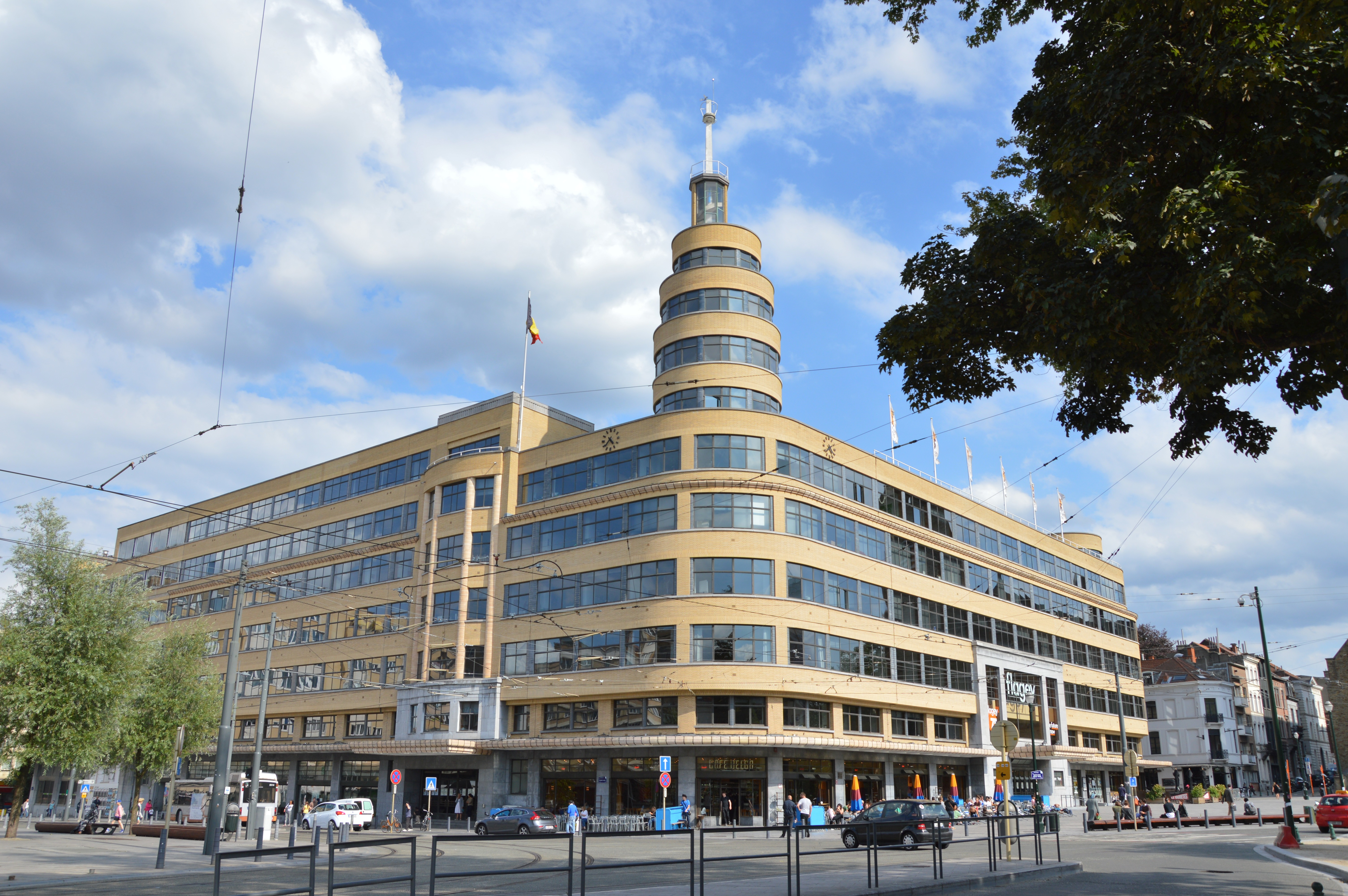
Flagey Building on the Place Eugène Flagey/Eugène Flageyplein

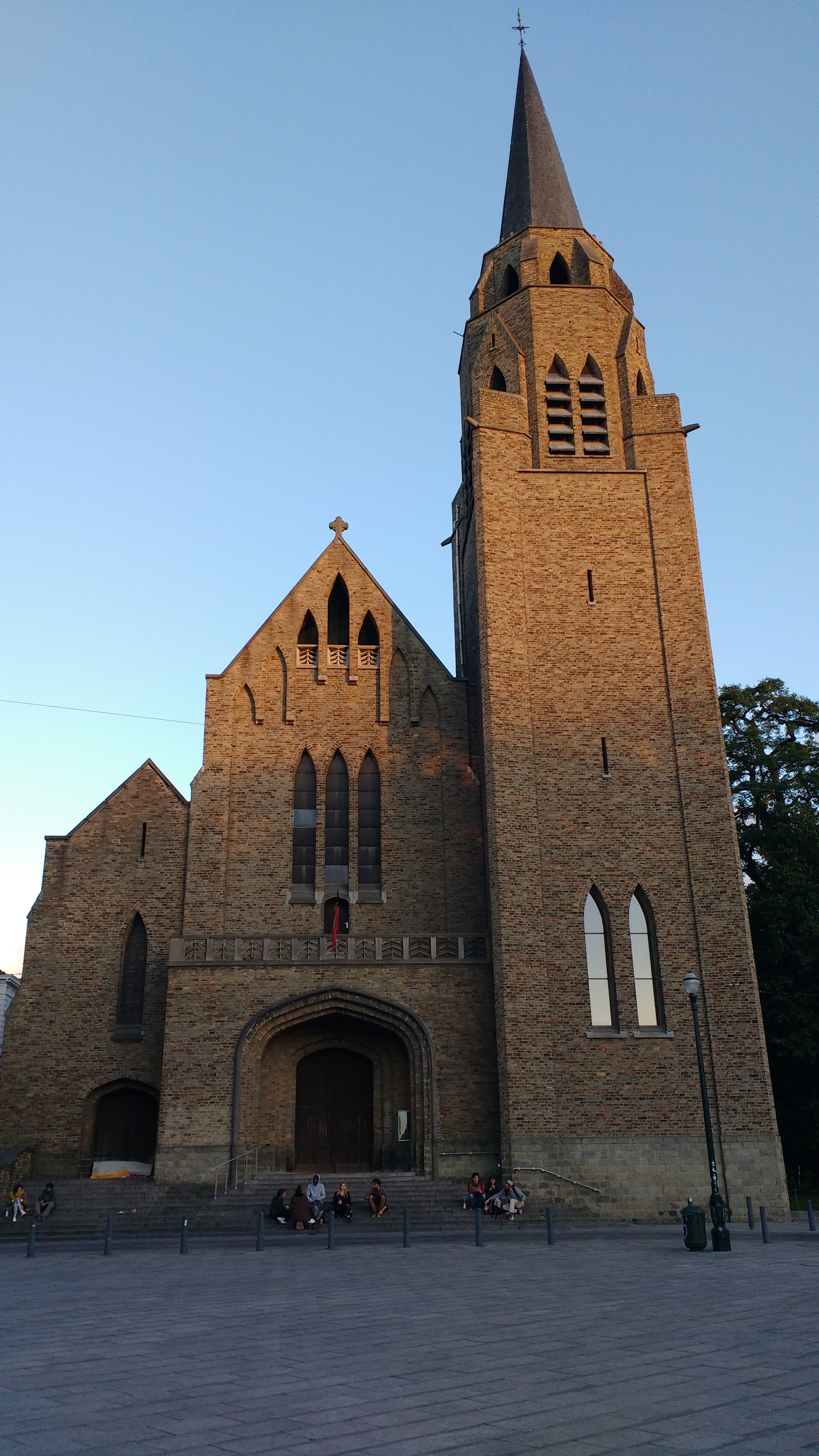
Church of the Holy Cross

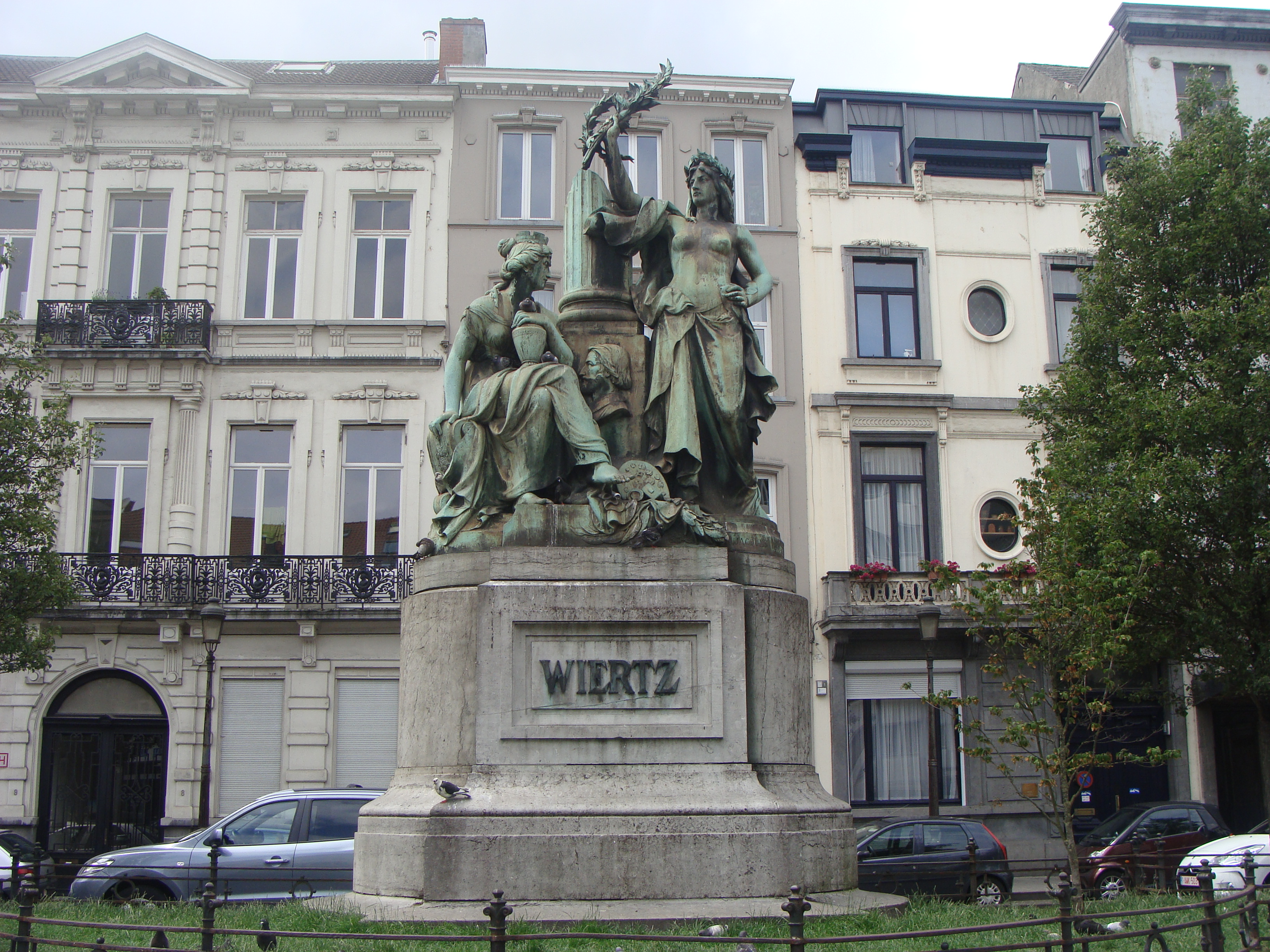
Place Raymond Blyckaerts/Raymond Blyckaertsplein (Antoine Wiertz)

==== Ixelles Ponds ====
Located to the south of the Place Flagey, the Ixelles Ponds district is the site of the former fishponds of La Cambre Abbey. Today, it offers a panorama of architecture from the mid-19th century to the immediate post-WWII period. The avenues surrounding the park feature a number of buildings in eclectic, Art Nouveau and Art Deco styles, designed by architects such as Léon Delune, Aimable Delune, Ernest Blerot and Stanislas Jasinski.

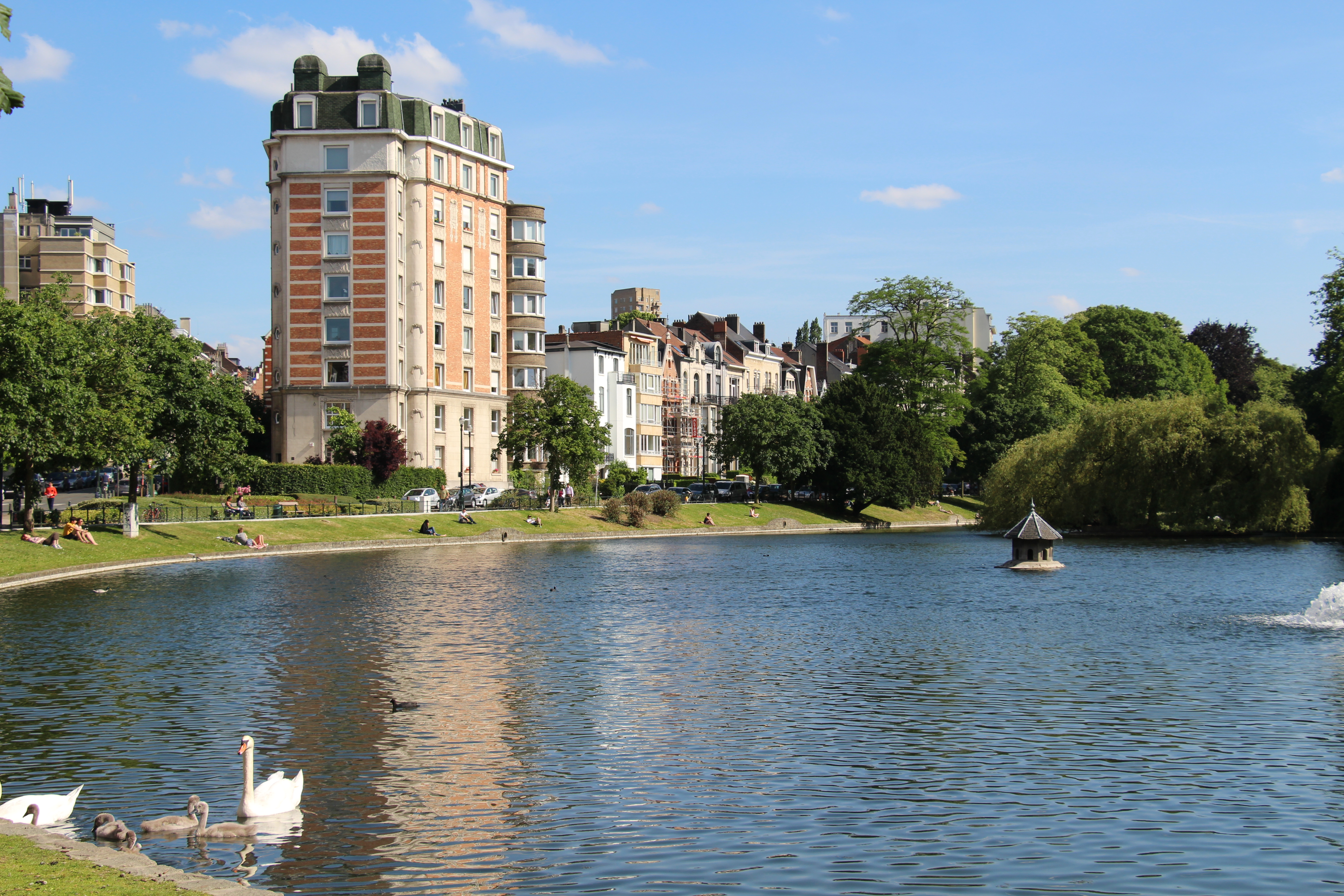
Ixelles Ponds

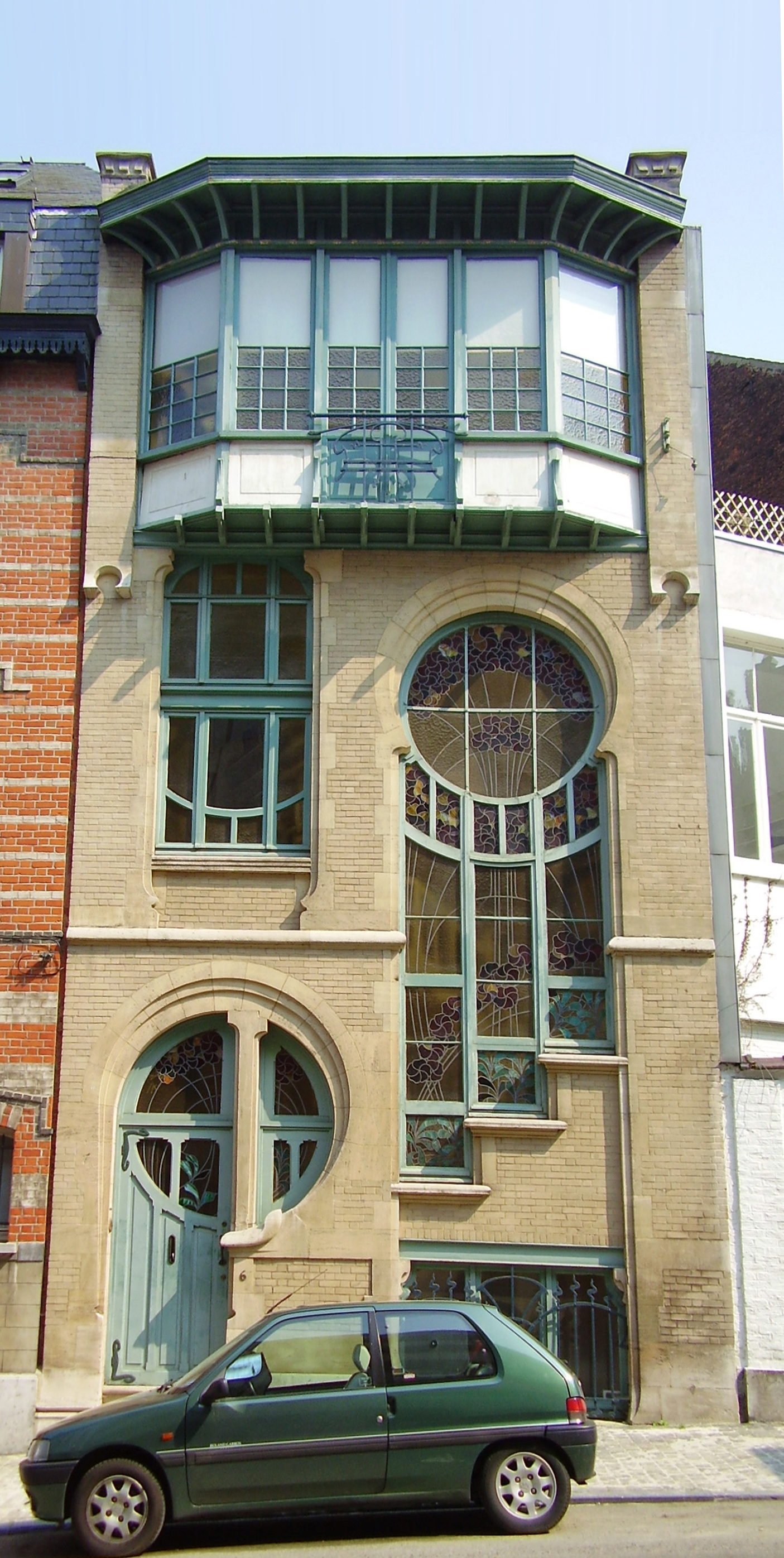
Sterner's Studio

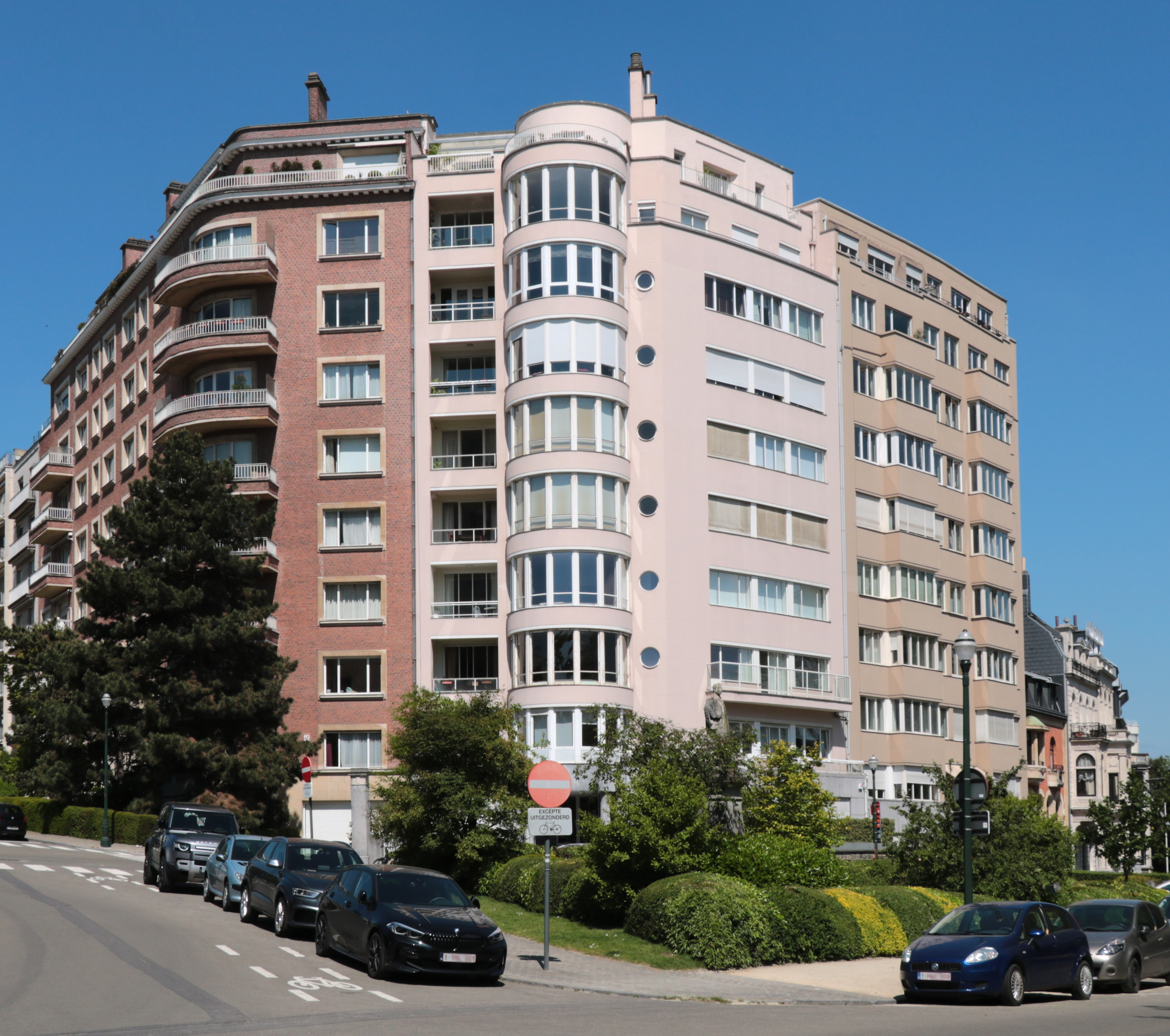
Résidence Belle-Vue

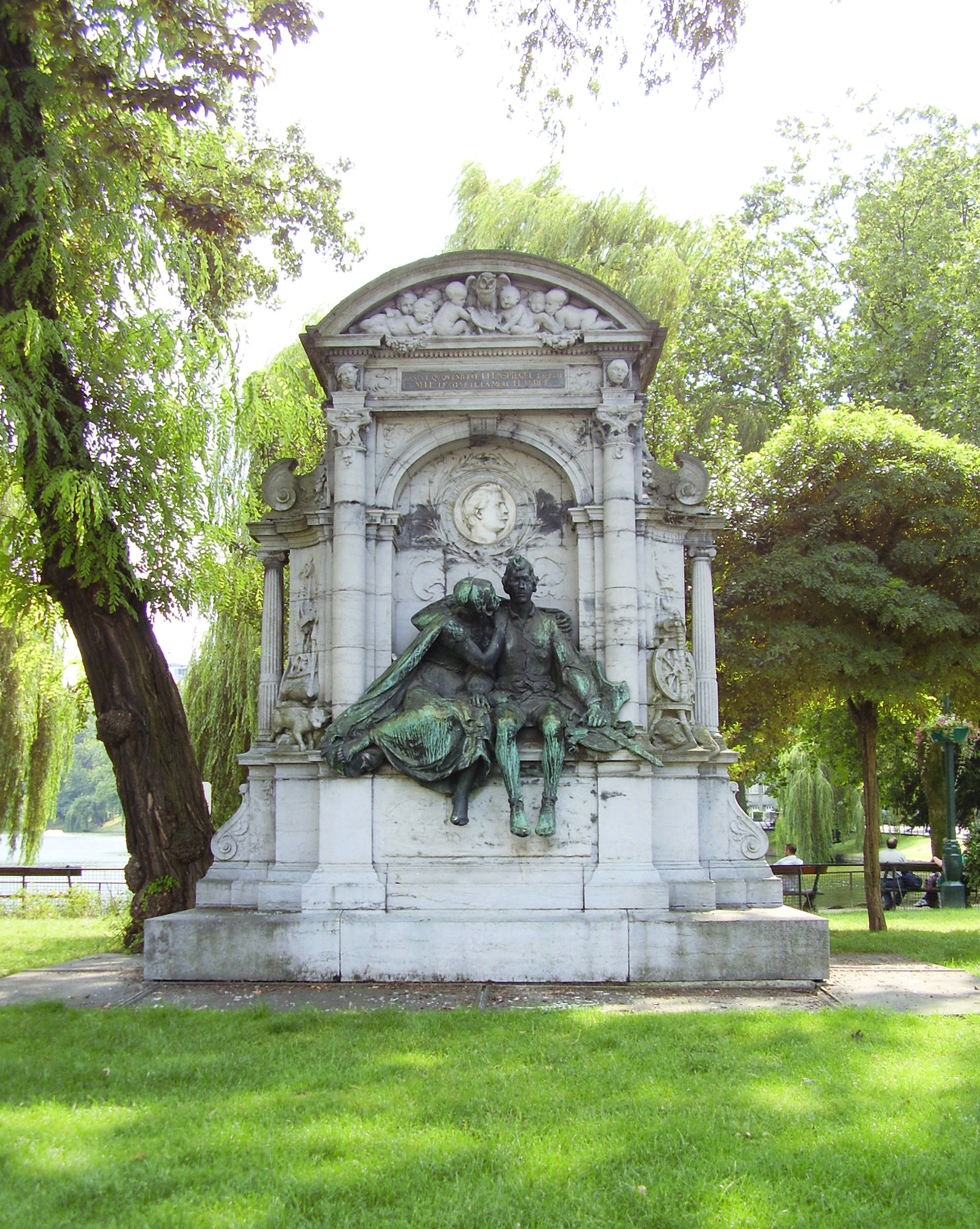
Monument to Charles De Coster

==== La Cambre–Étoile ====
Located in the southern part of Ixelles, this district was built around the former La Cambre Abbey. The neighbourhood used to be an independent municipality in the 18th century. It is now home to the École nationale supérieure des arts visuels de La Cambre (ENSAV), also simply known as La Cambre, one of the leading visual arts and design schools in Belgium, as well as the abbey's gardens. A short walk from the abbey is the Place de l'Étoile/Sterrenplein, one of the most important intersections in Brussels, known for the Art Deco and modernist apartment buildings that line it.

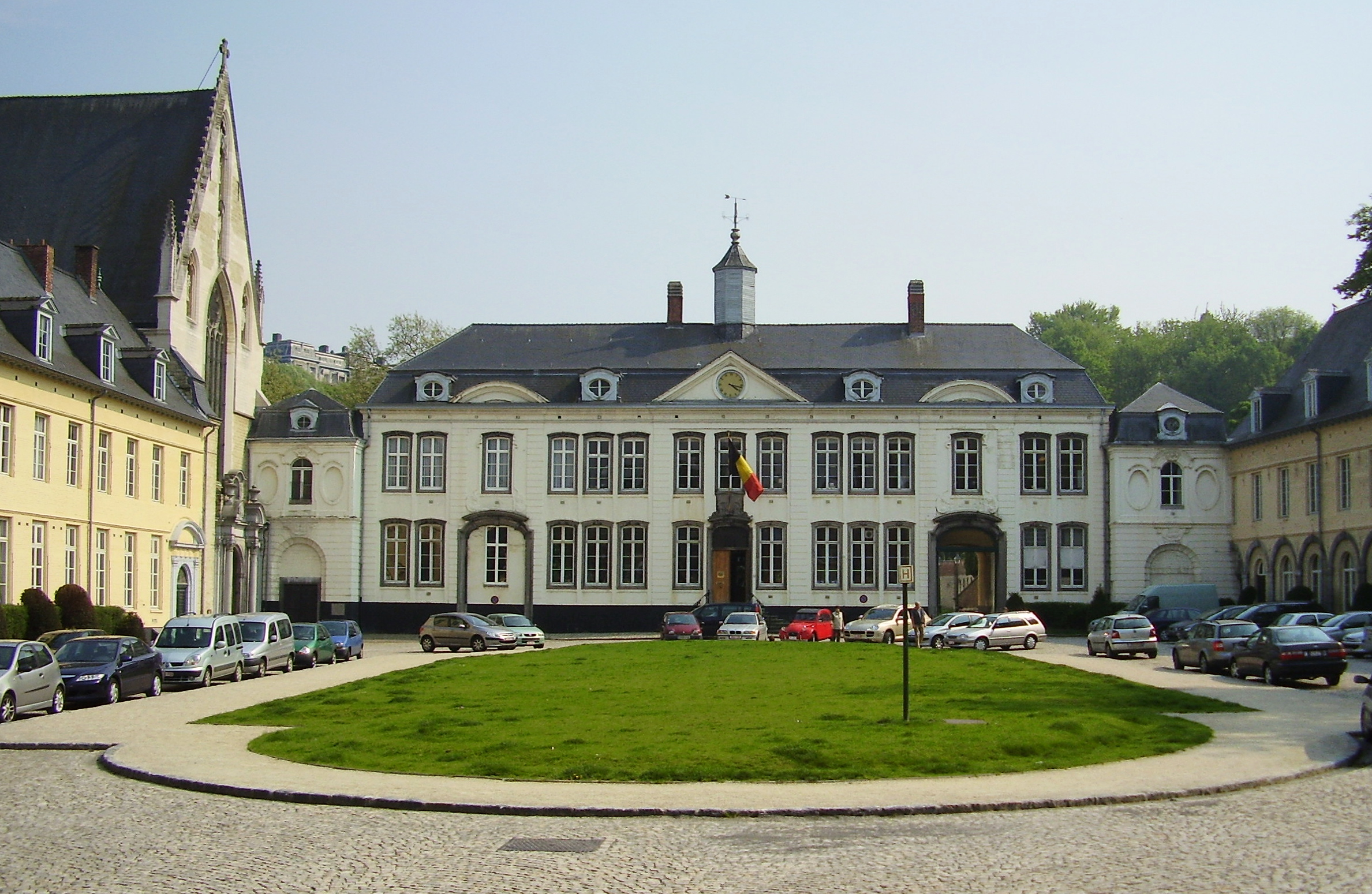
La Cambre Abbey

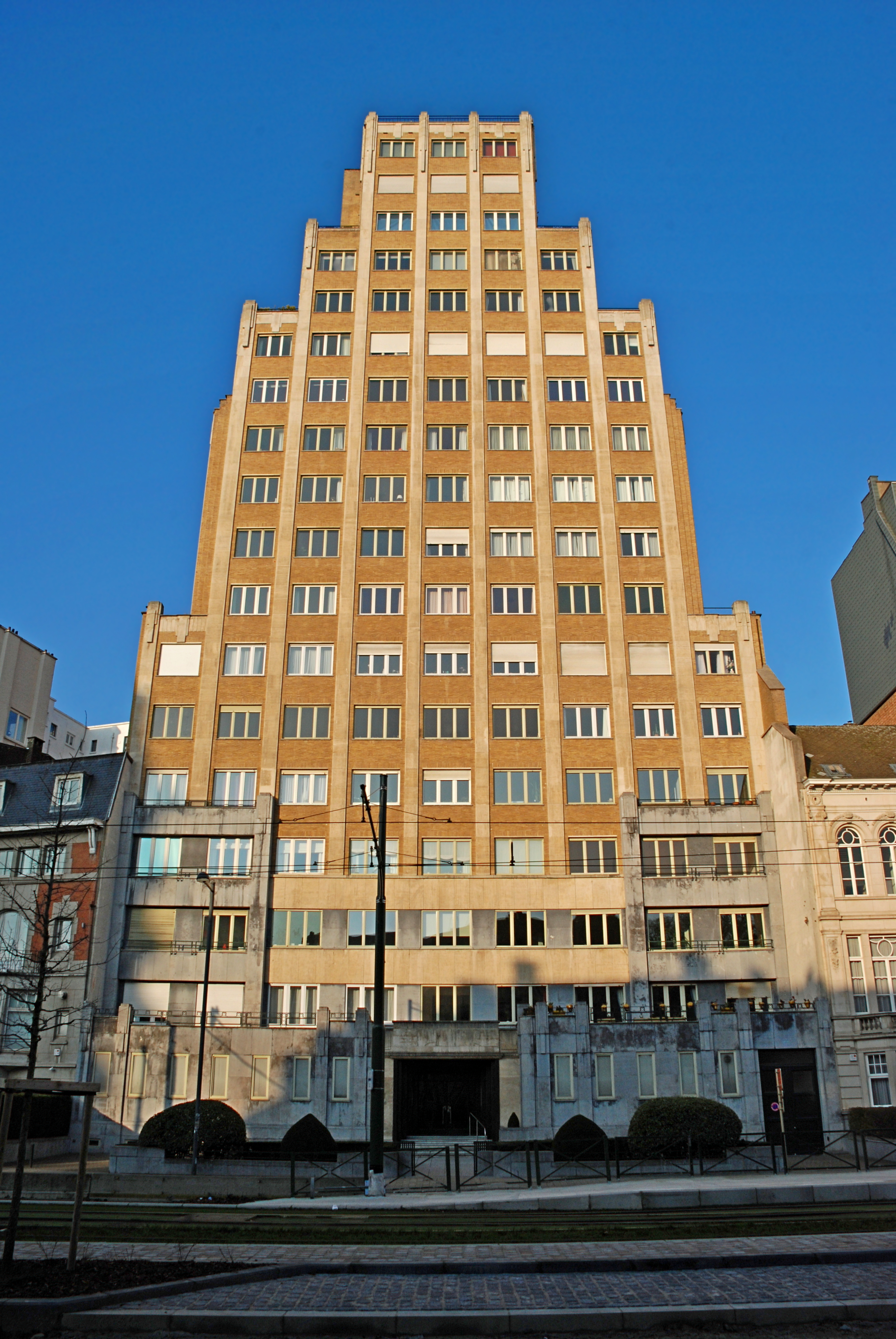
Résidence de la Cambre

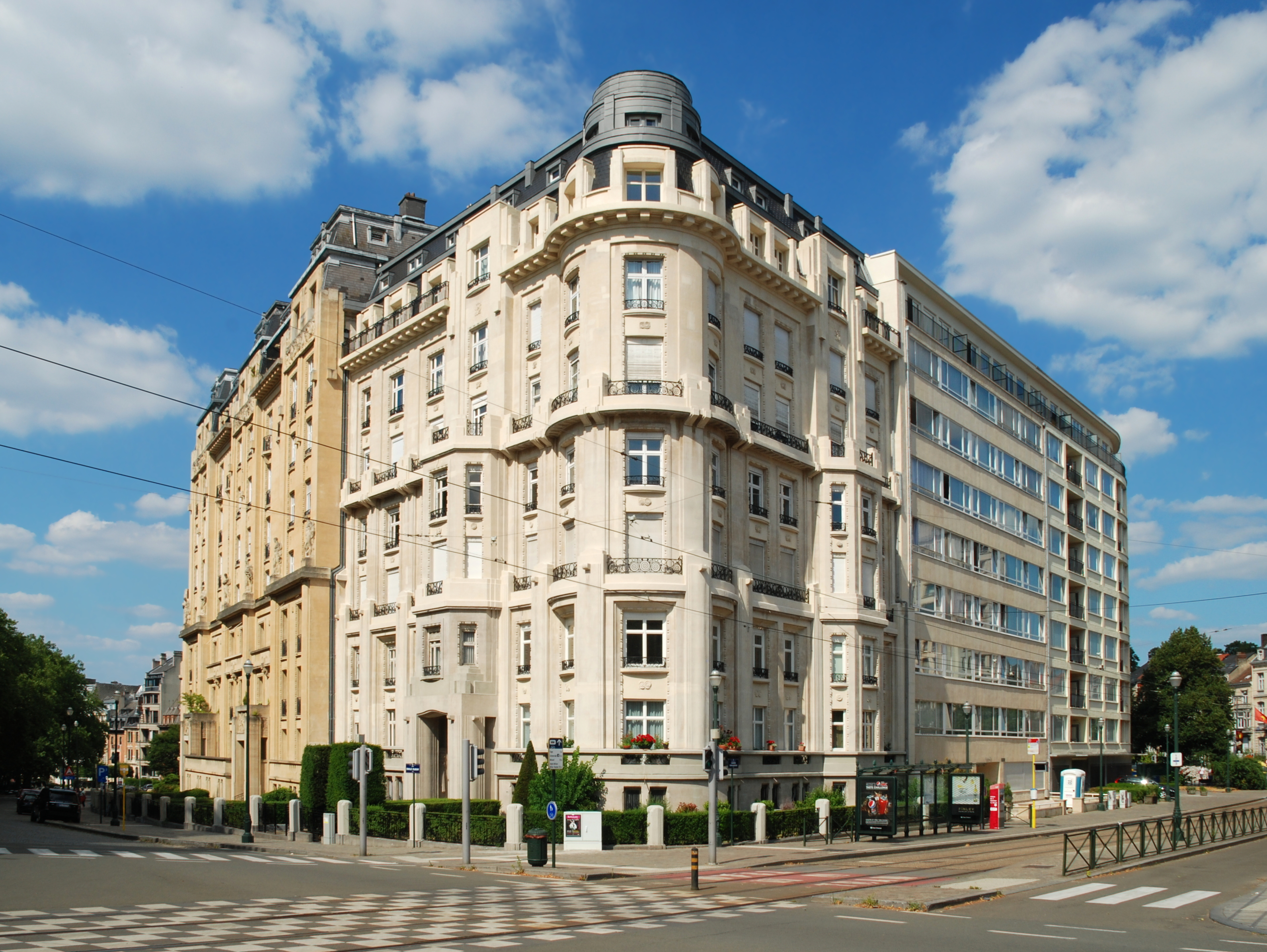
Palais de la Cambre

==== Little Switzerland (Ixelles Cemetery) ====
Located in the eastern part of Ixelles, the Little Switzerland district (French: Quartier de la Petite Suisse, Dutch: Klein Zwiterslandwijk), more recently known as the Ixelles Cemetery district (abbreviated Cim d'Ix or Cimdix), urbanised between 1870 and 1920. It is a student district with a lot of bars and restaurants, located at the strategic junction between two universities, the Dutch-speaking Vrije Universiteit Brussel (VUB) and the French-speaking Université libre de Bruxelles (ULB).

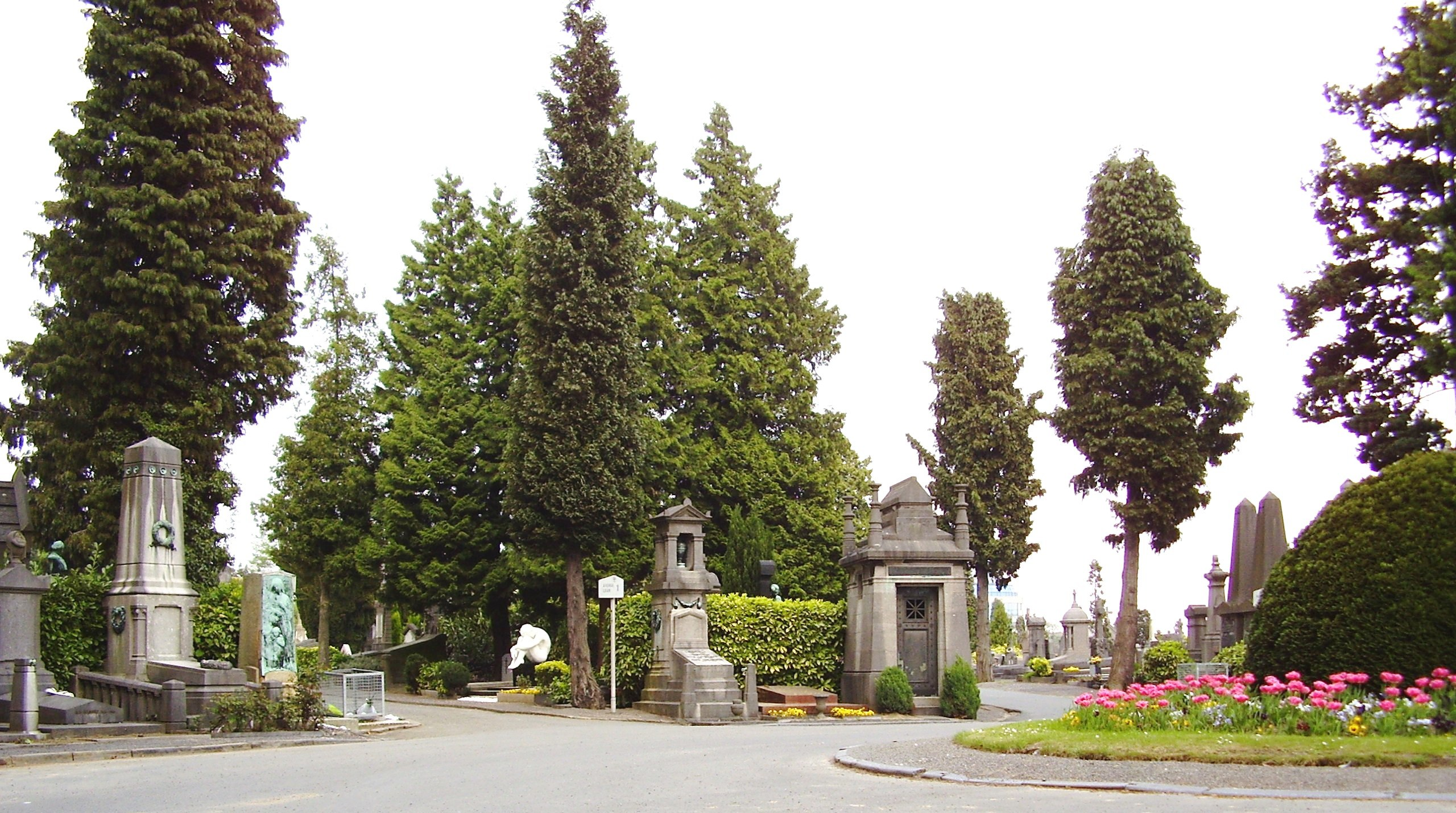
Ixelles Cemetery

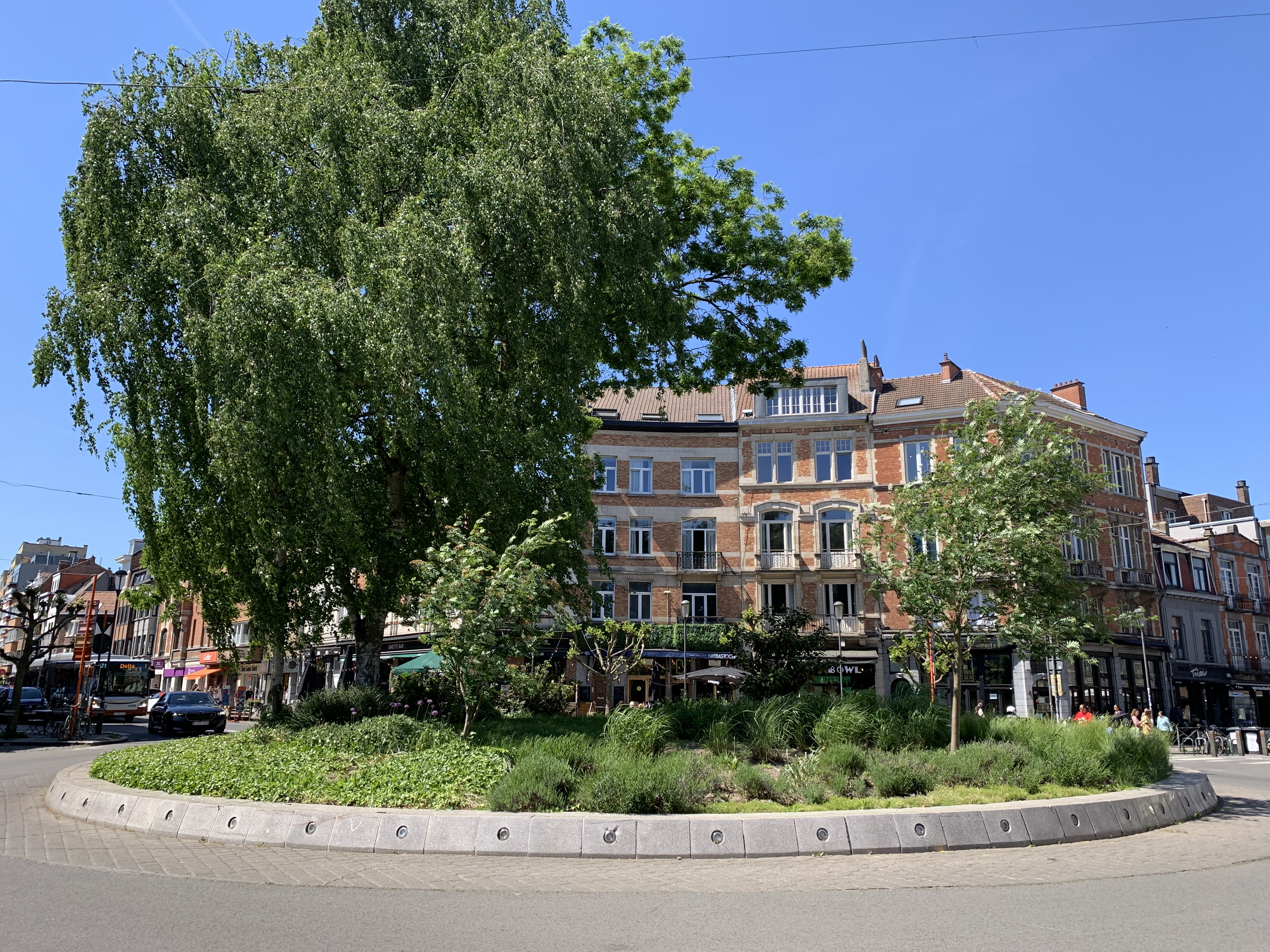
Ixelles Cemetery Roundabout

==== La Plaine/Het Plein ====
Located in the east of Ixelles, La Plaine/Het Plein ("The Plain") overlooks the Boulevard Général Jacques/Generaal Jacqueslaan to the north, the Boulevard du Triomphe/Triomflaan to the east and the Boulevard de la Plaine/Pleinlaan to the west. This 45 ha (110 acres) university campus is located on the site of a former military exercise ground, from which it takes its name.

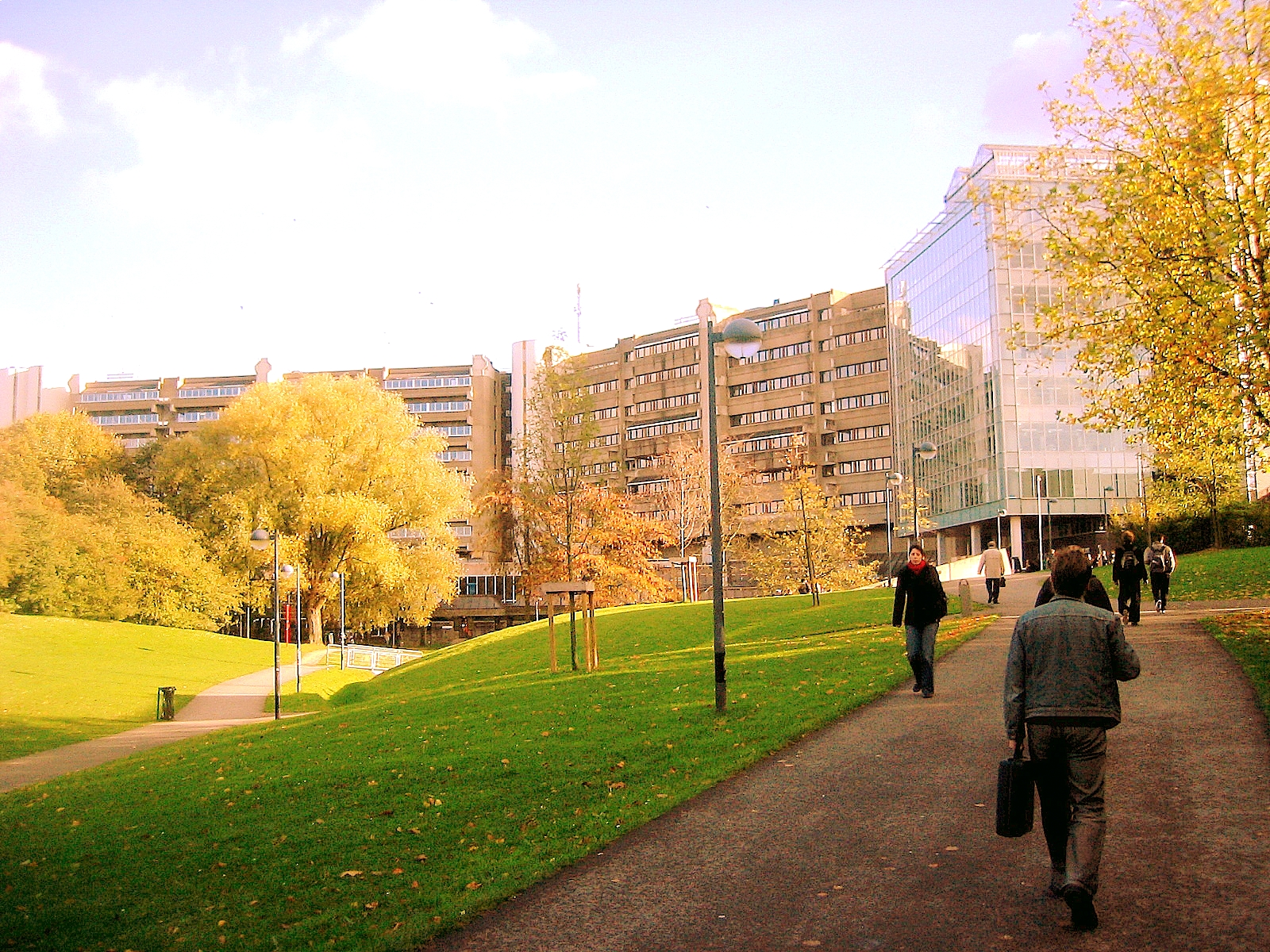
Etterbeek campus of the Vrije Universiteit Brussel (VUB)

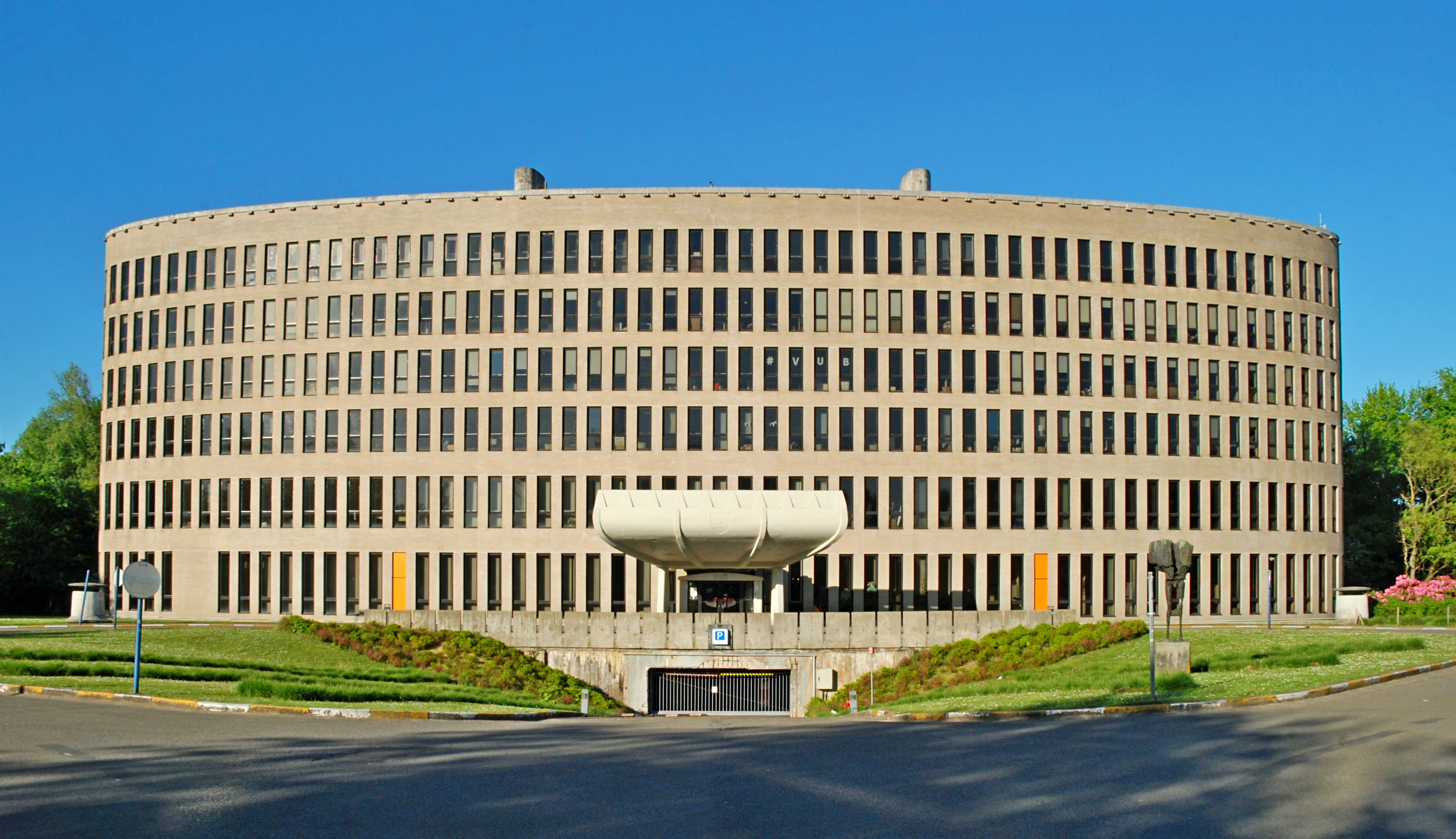
Braem Building

==== Châtelain/Kastelein ====
Located in the western exclave of Ixelles, between the Chaussée de Charleroi/Charleroisesteenweg in Saint-Gilles to the west, the Chaussée de Waterloo/Waterloosesteenweg to the south, and the southern extension of Brussels with the Avenue Louise/Louizalaan and the Chaussée de Vleurgat/Vleurgatsesteenweg to the east, this district corresponds to the historic hamlet of Tenbosch/Tenbos. Today, it is well known for its fashionable restaurants, bars and craft shops, which extend around the Place du Châtelain/Kasteleinsplein and are mainly frequented by a French public.

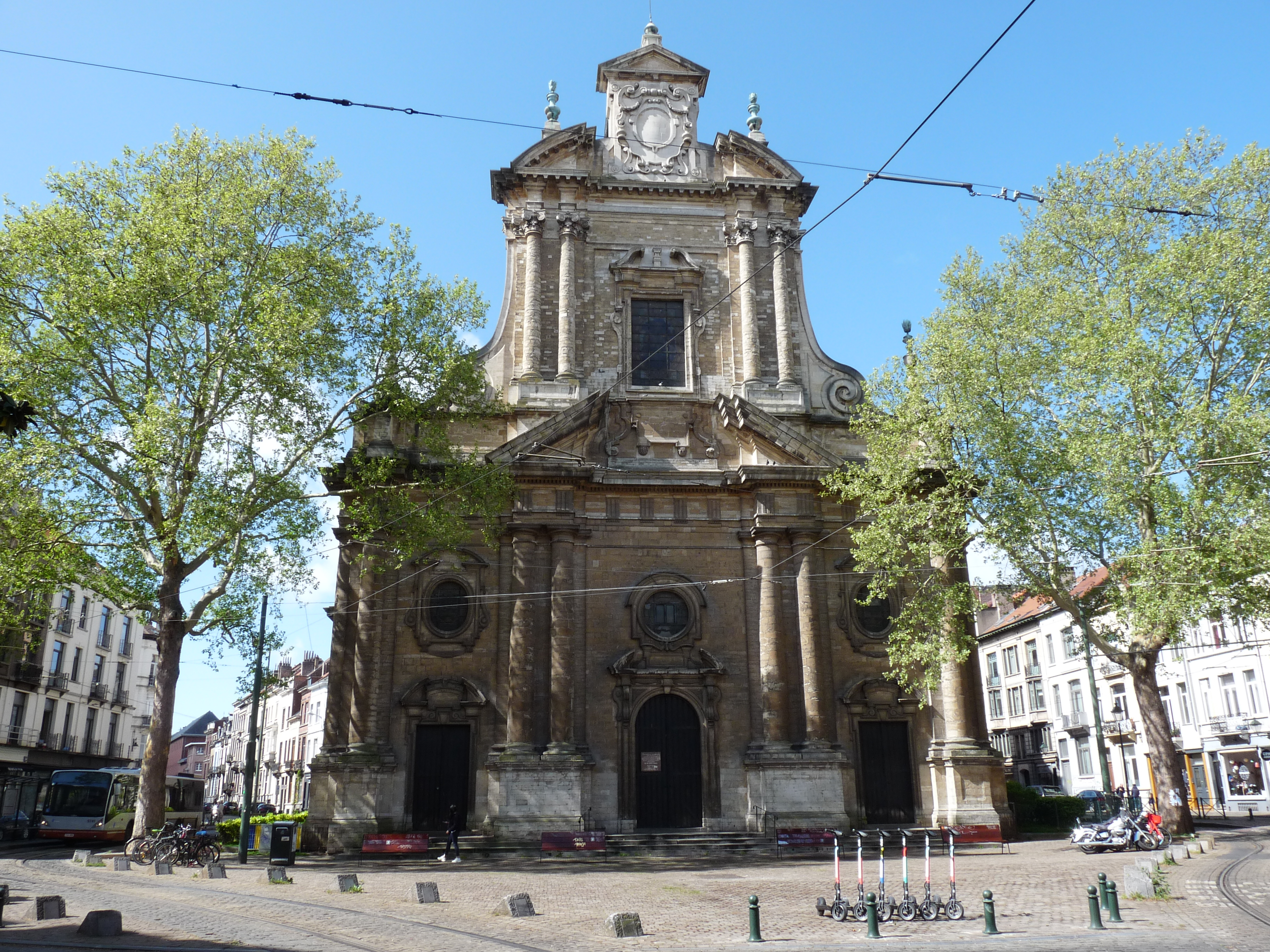
Church of the Holy Trinity

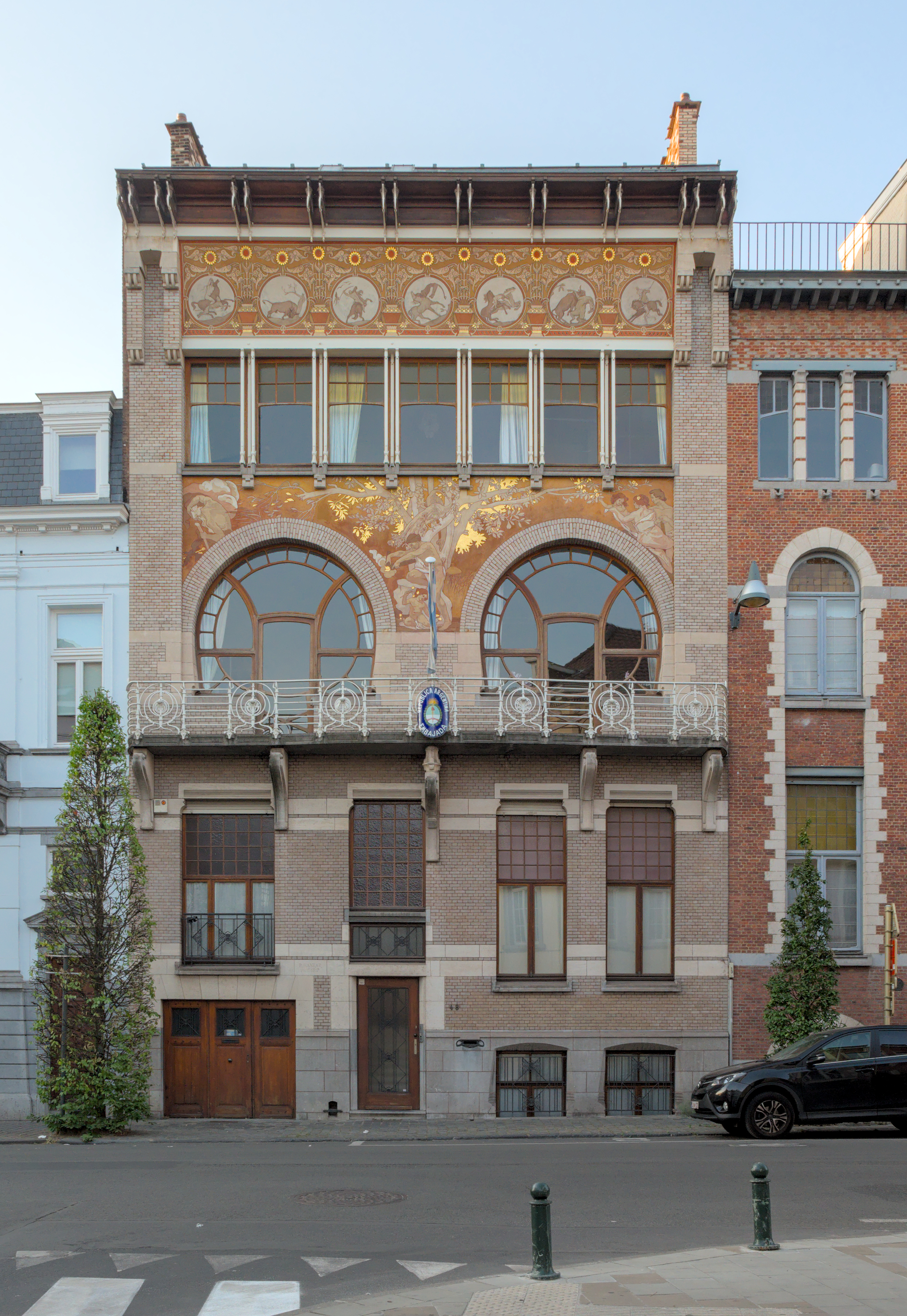
Hôtel Albert Ciamberlani

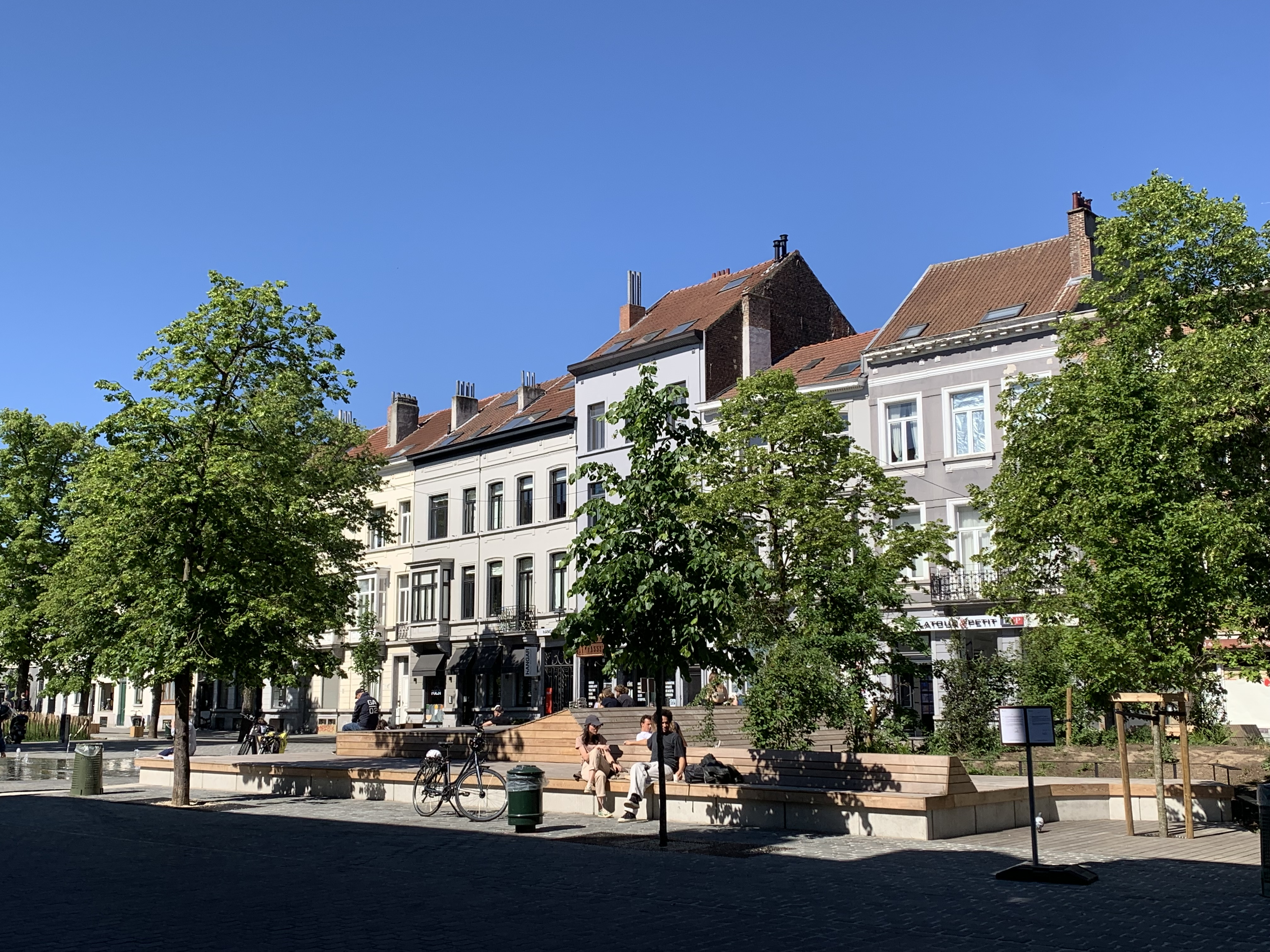
Place du Châtelain/Kasteleinsplein

==== Berkendael/Berkendaal ====
Berkendael/Berkendaal, together with the Châtelain district, is located in the western exclave of Ixelles. The district lies on the border with Uccle to the south and with Forest to the south-west. It is a chic and less dense neighbourhood than the rest of Ixelles and has many early 20th-century houses in different styles such as Art Nouveau, Art Deco, eclecticism and modernism, several of which are protected.

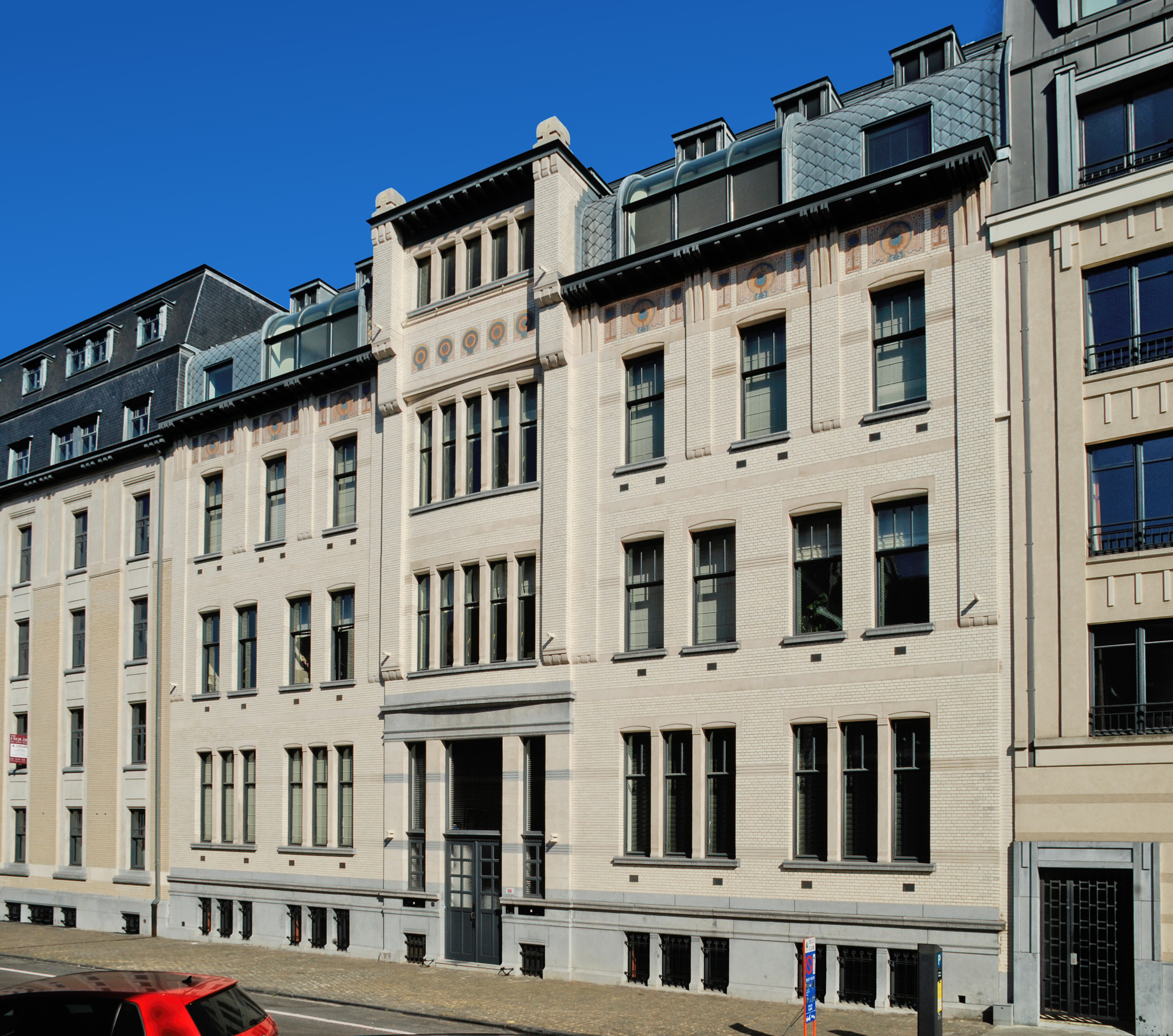
Berkendael Surgical Institute

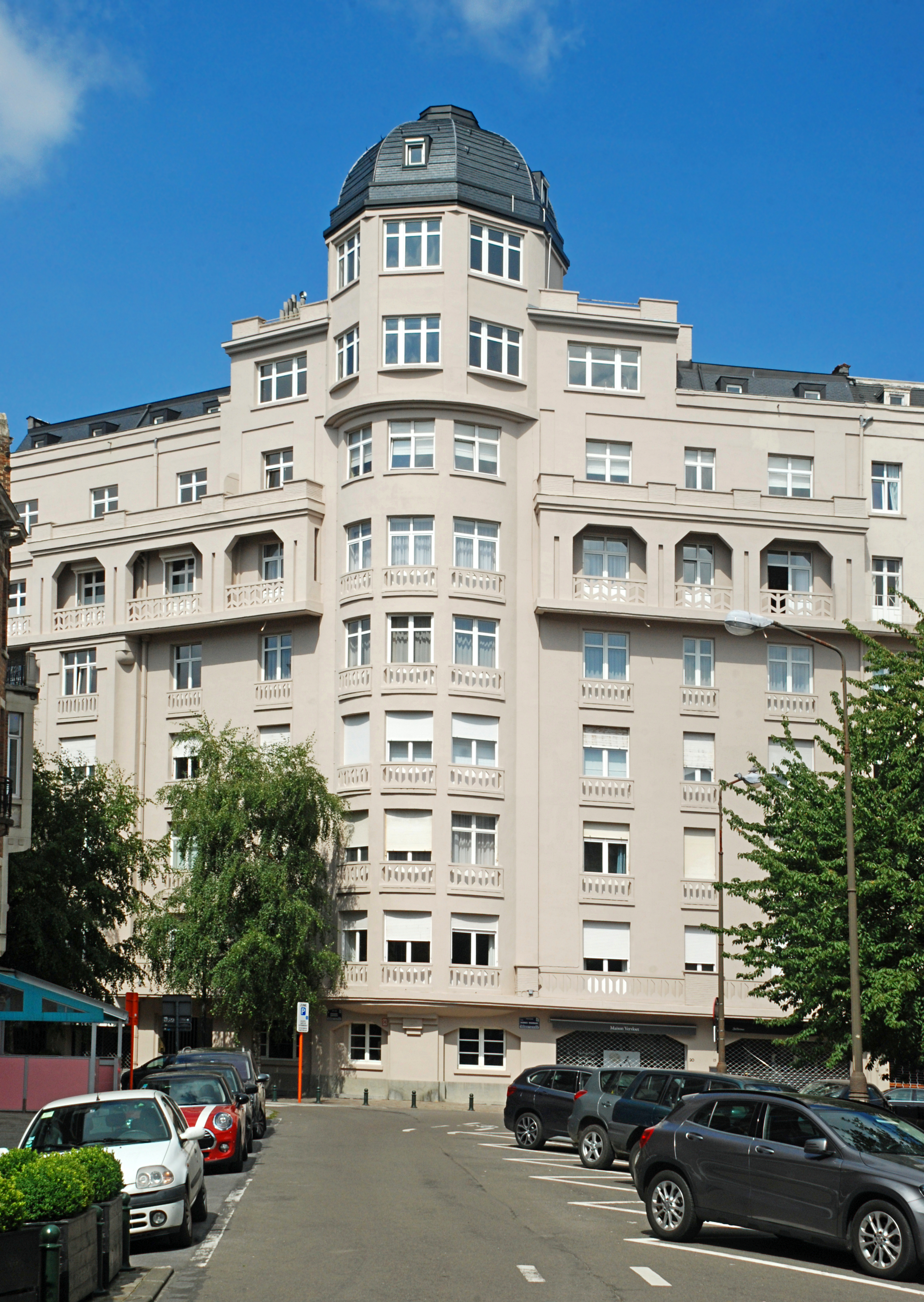
Place Georges Brugmann/Georges Brugmannplein

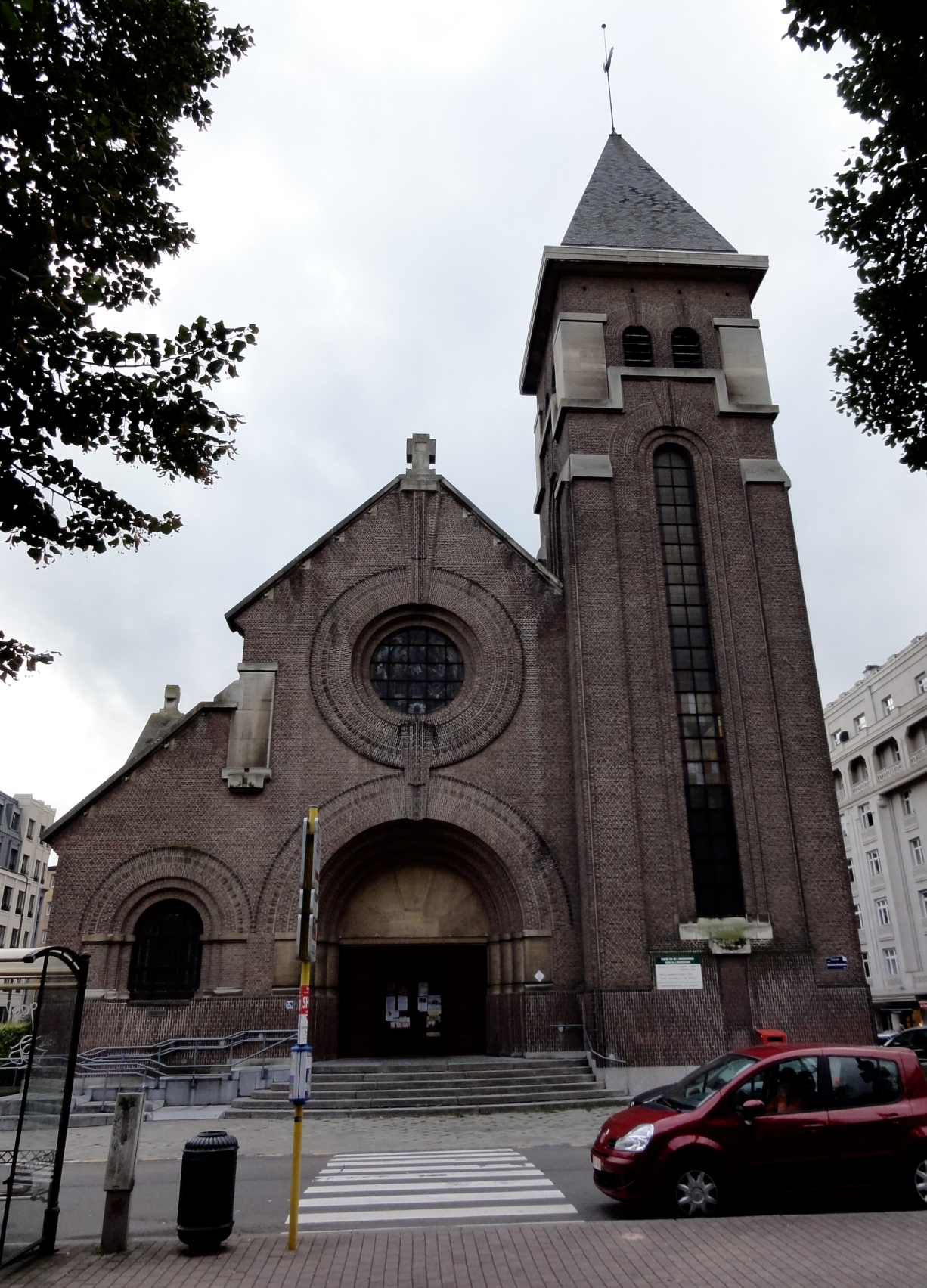
Church of Our Lady of the Annunciation

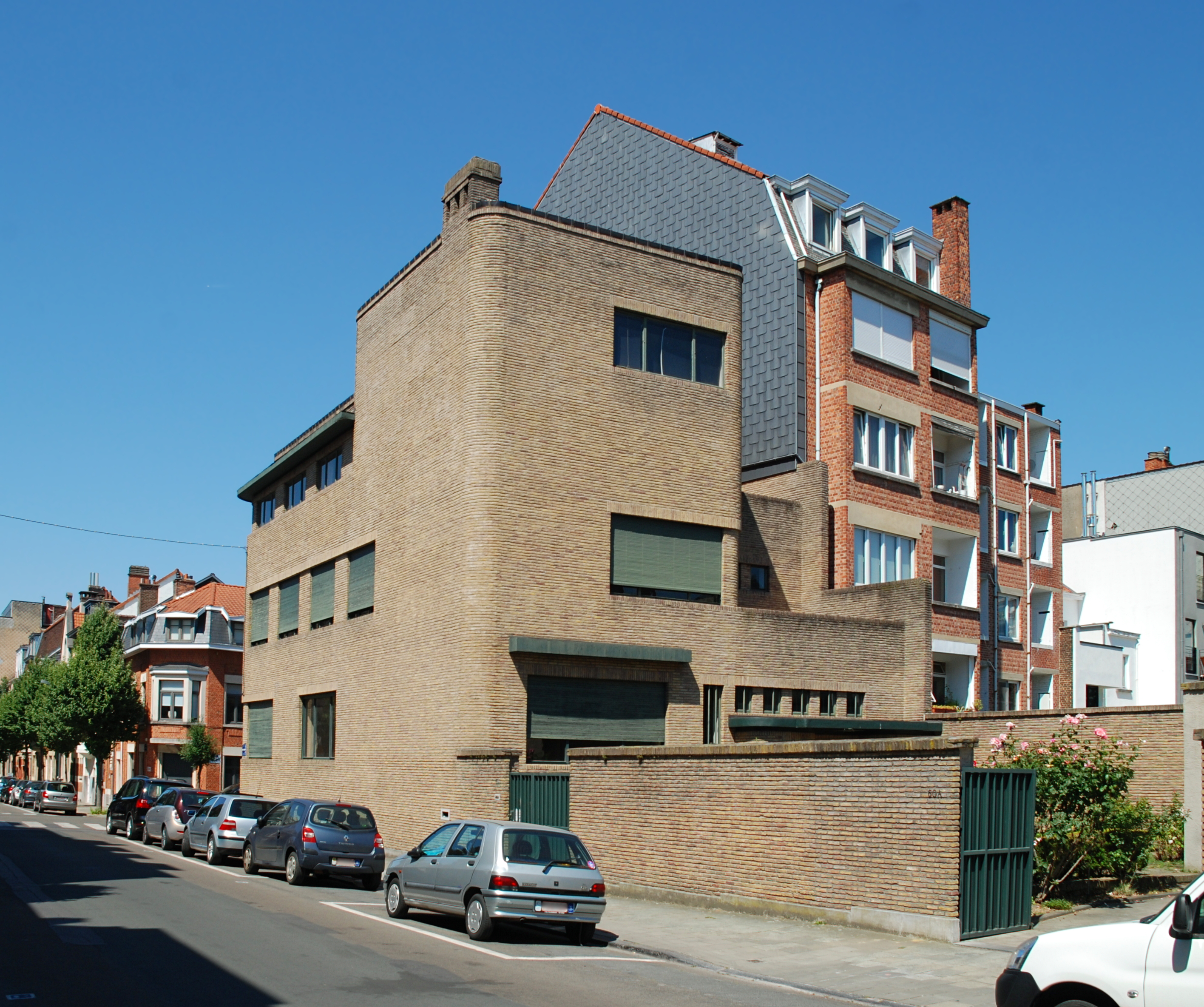
Wolfers House

==== Boondael/Boondaal ====
Boondael/Boondaal is a residential district largely located in the south of Ixelles, with pieces extending into the City of Brussels and Watermael-Boitsfort. It corresponds to the area between the Bois de la Cambre/Ter Kamerenbos and the Avenue Franklin Roosevelt/Franklin Rooseveltlaan to the west, the Solbosch district to the north, as well as the stretch of railway line 26 between Boondael railway station and the intersection with railway line 161 to the south-east. At its centre lies the Square du Vieux Tilleul/Oude-Lindesquare with the old Boondael Chapel, which is now used for artistic and cultural activities.

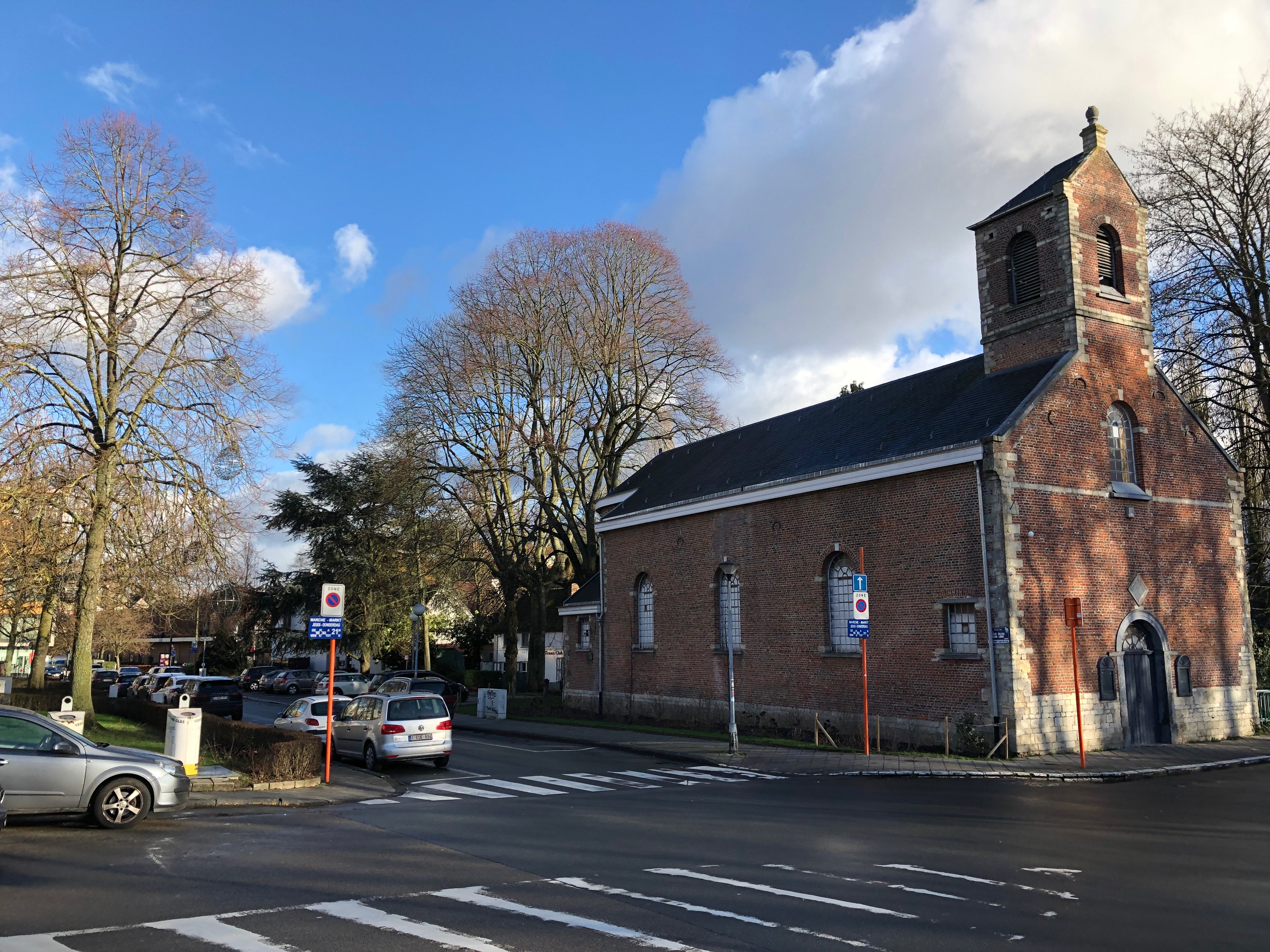
Boondael Chapel on the Square du Vieux Tilleul/Oude-Lindesquare

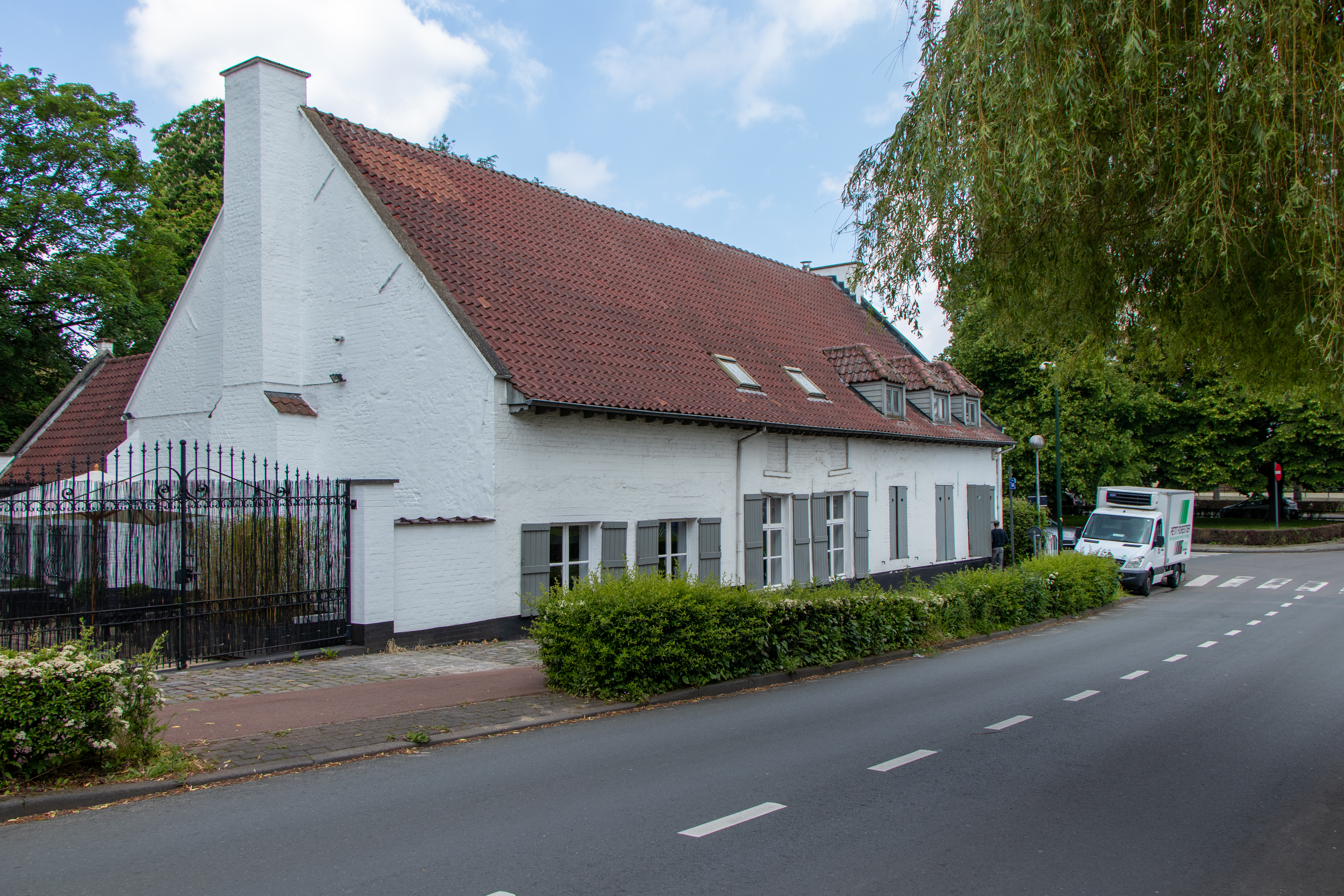
L'Auberge de Boendael

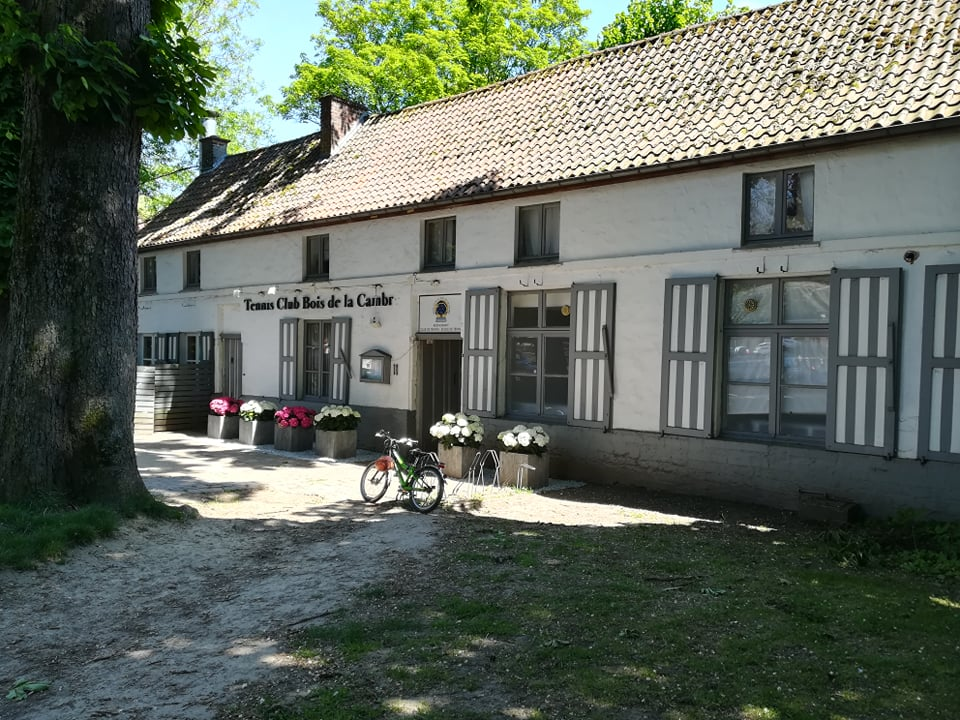
Tennis Club Bois de la Cambre

=== Jette ===
==== Historical centre ====
The historical centre of Jette is the municipality's central district.

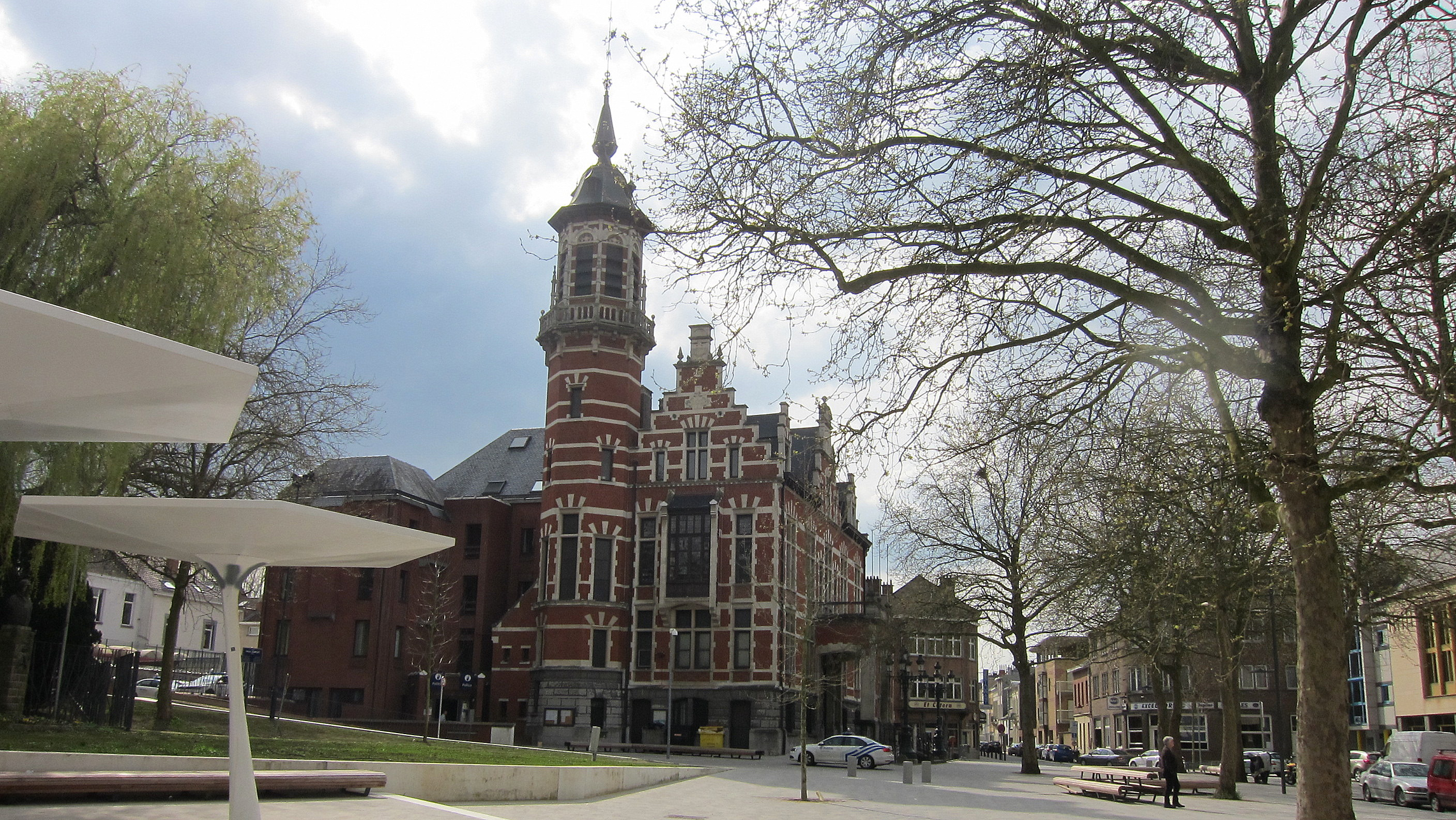
Jette's Municipal Hall

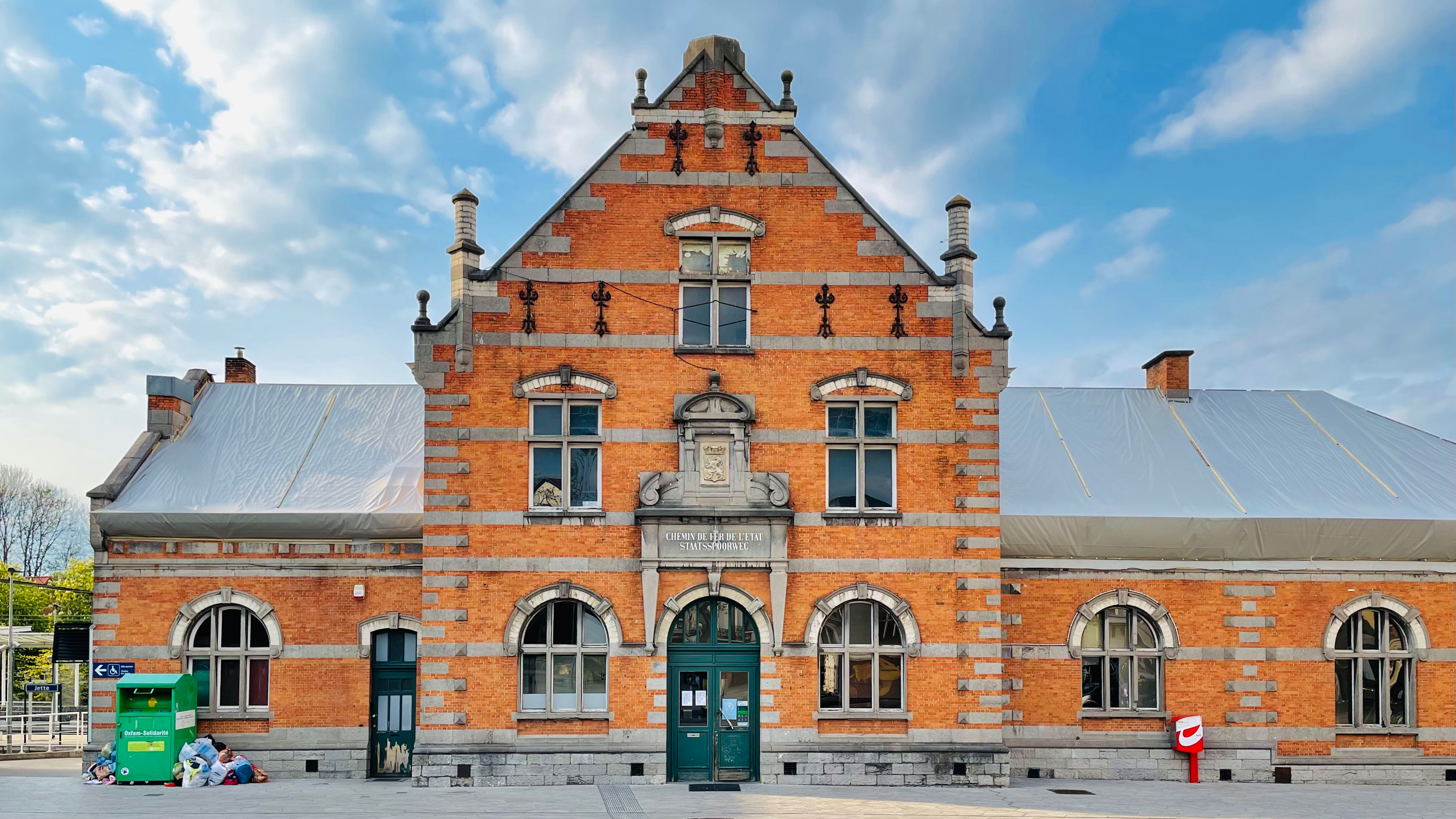
Jette railway station

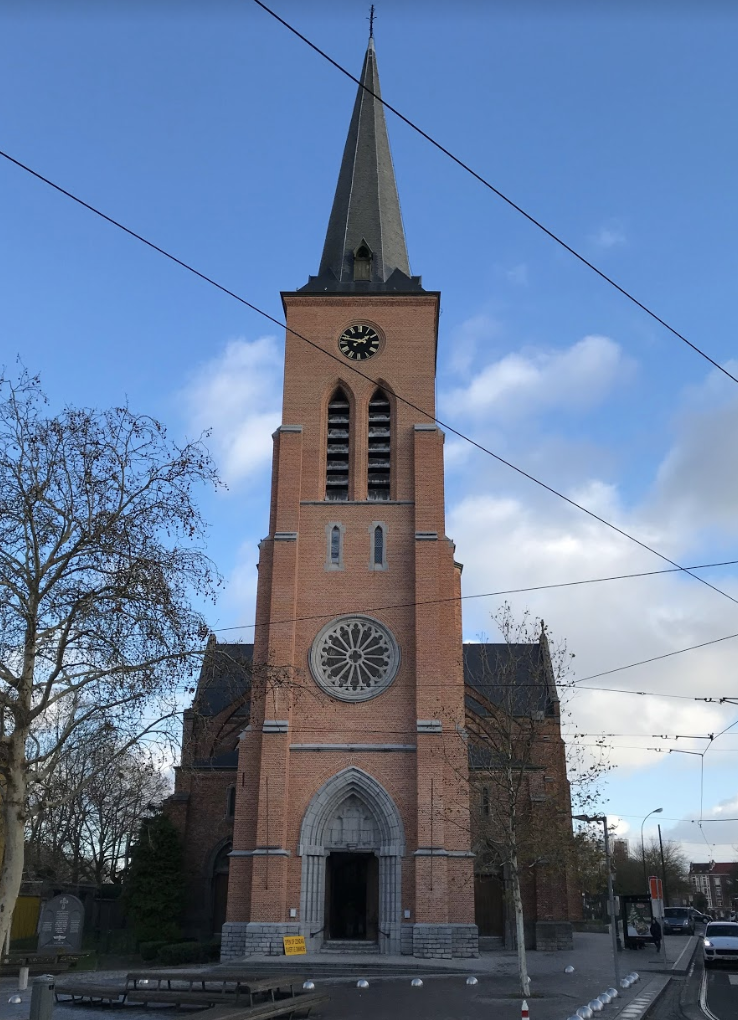
Church of St. Peter

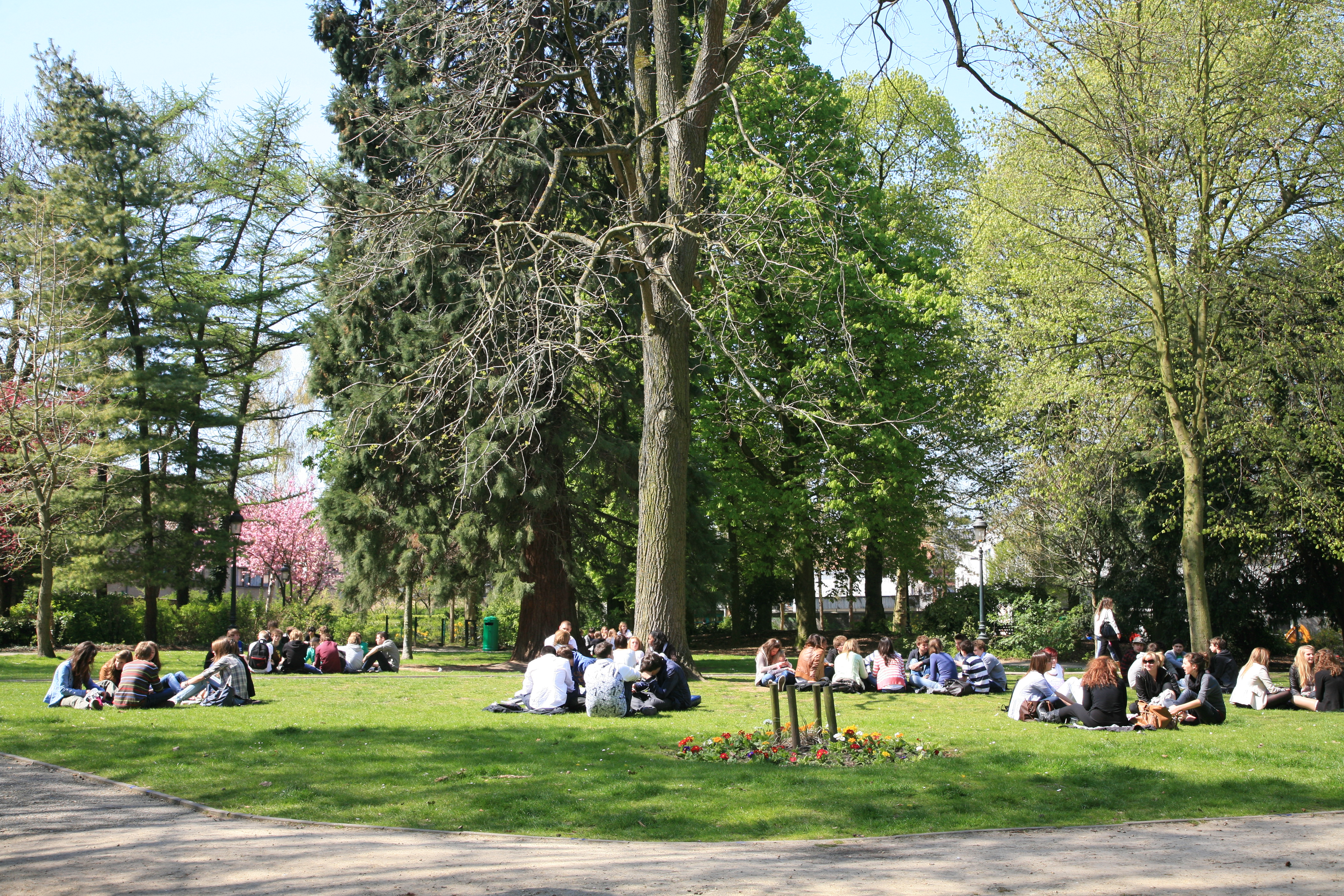
Garcet Park

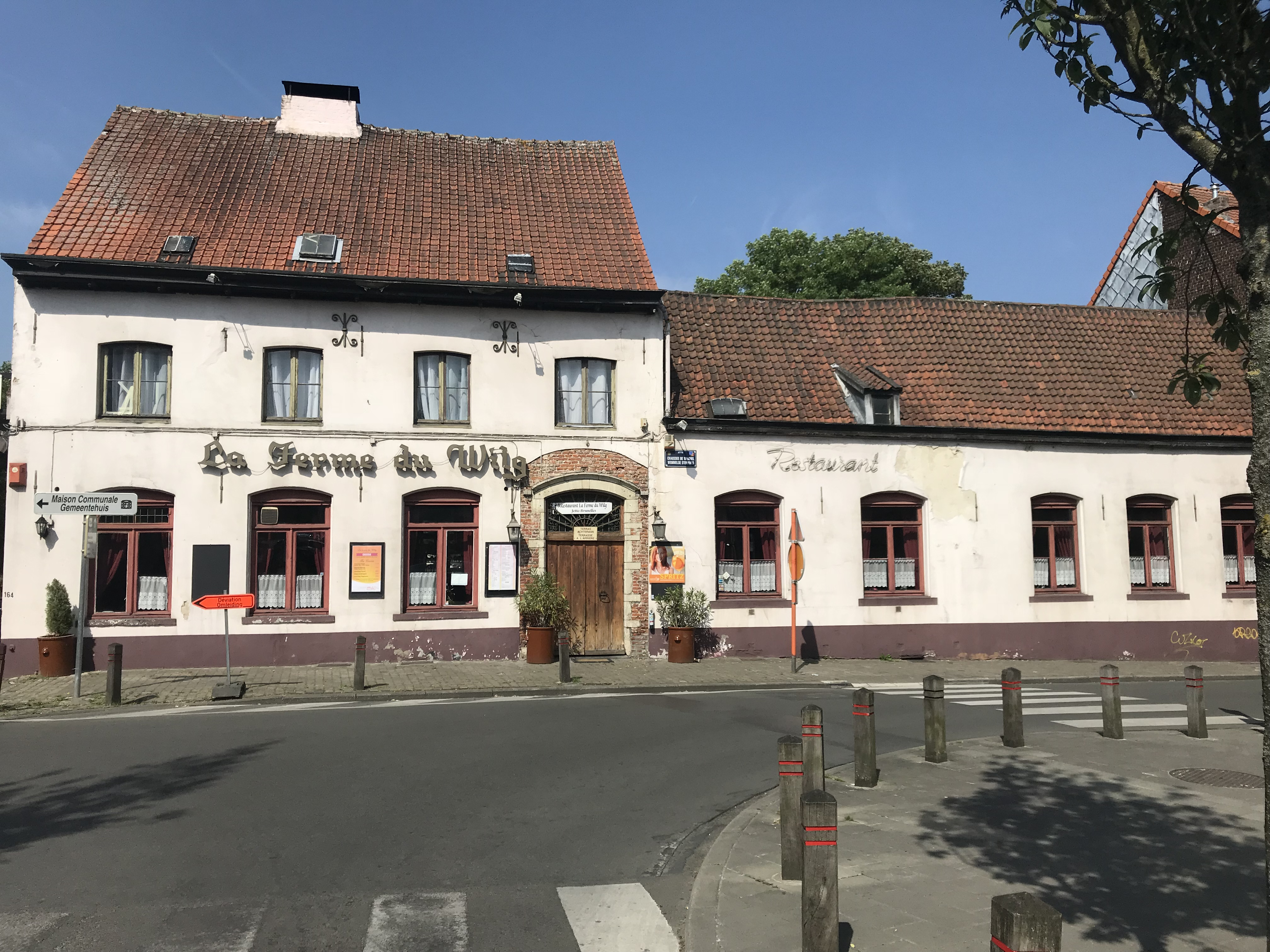
La Ferme du Wilg

==== Miroir/Spiegel ====
Located in the south of Jette, this district is centred on the Place Reine Astrid/Koningin Astridplein, still commonly known as the Place du Miroir/Spiegelplein in memory of an inn that once stood there. Today, it is the municipality's main commercial and social hub, boasting numerous shops, cafés and public services. It also hosts an important Sunday market.

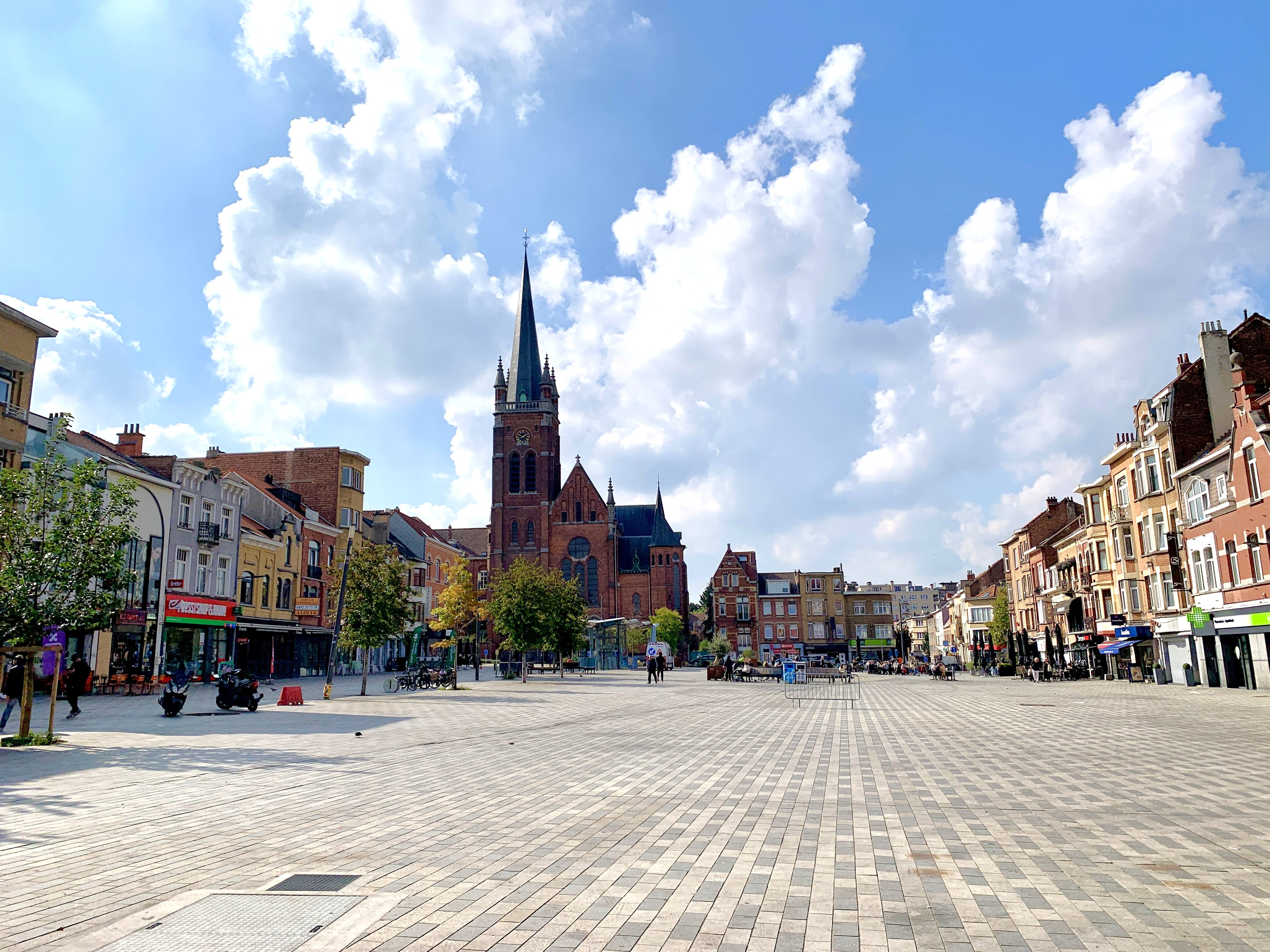
Place Reine Astrid/Koningin Astridplein and Church of St. Magdalene

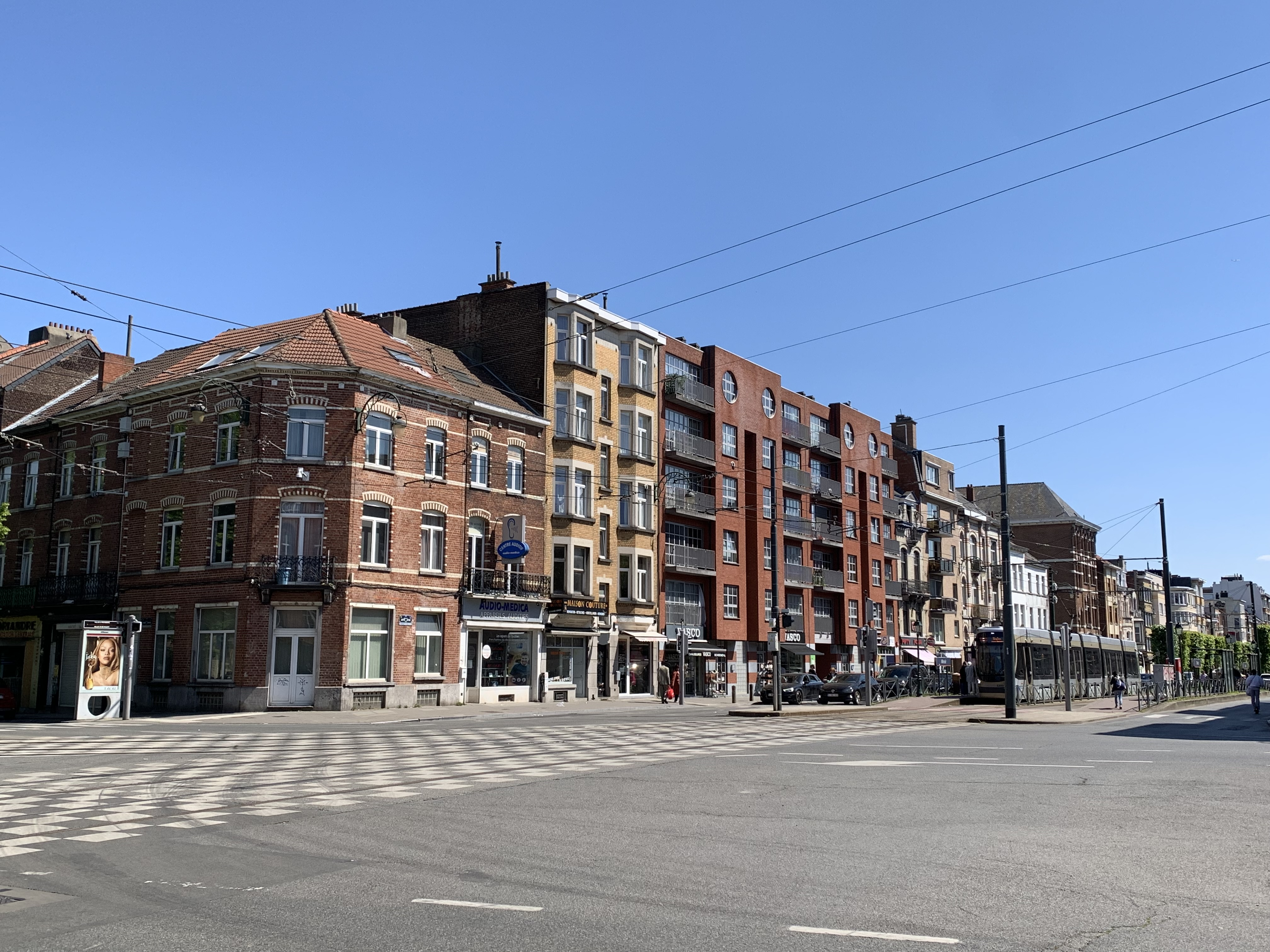
Avenue de Jette/Jetselaan

==== Esseghem/Essegem ====
Located in the east of Jette, this district includes the Esseghem/Essegem housing estate.

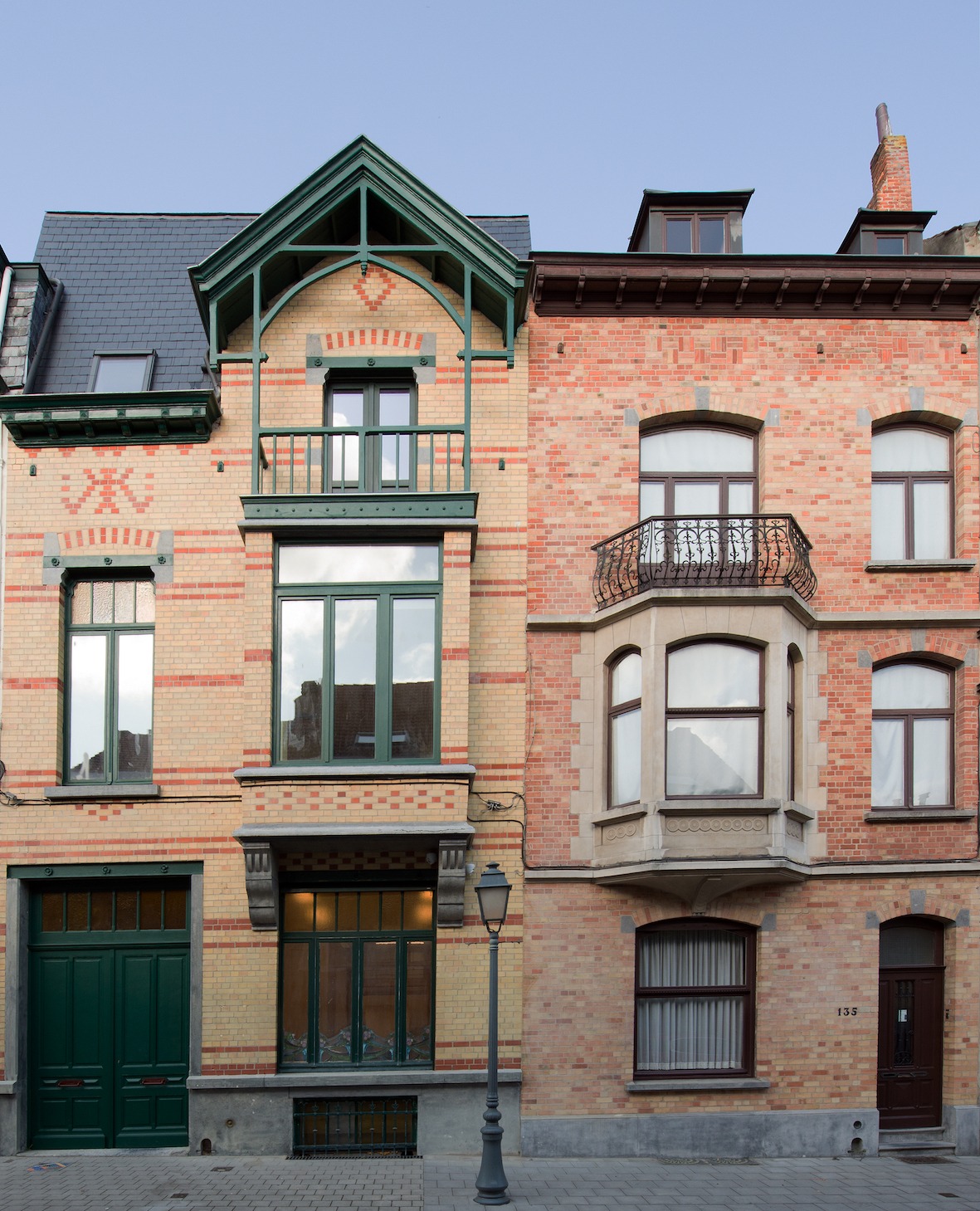
René Magritte Museum (right) and Museum of Abstract Art (left)

==== Woeste ====
Located in the south-east of Jette, this loosely defined district along the Avenue Charles Woeste/Charles Woestelaan presents a largely residential character. The neighbourhood combines a dense urban fabric with access to nearby green spaces. It is characterised by a mix of early- to mid-20th-century apartment buildings and single-family homes, reflecting the municipality's broader urban growth during that period. The presence of the Church of Our Lady of Lourdes and its adjacent grotto also lend the quarter a historical touch.

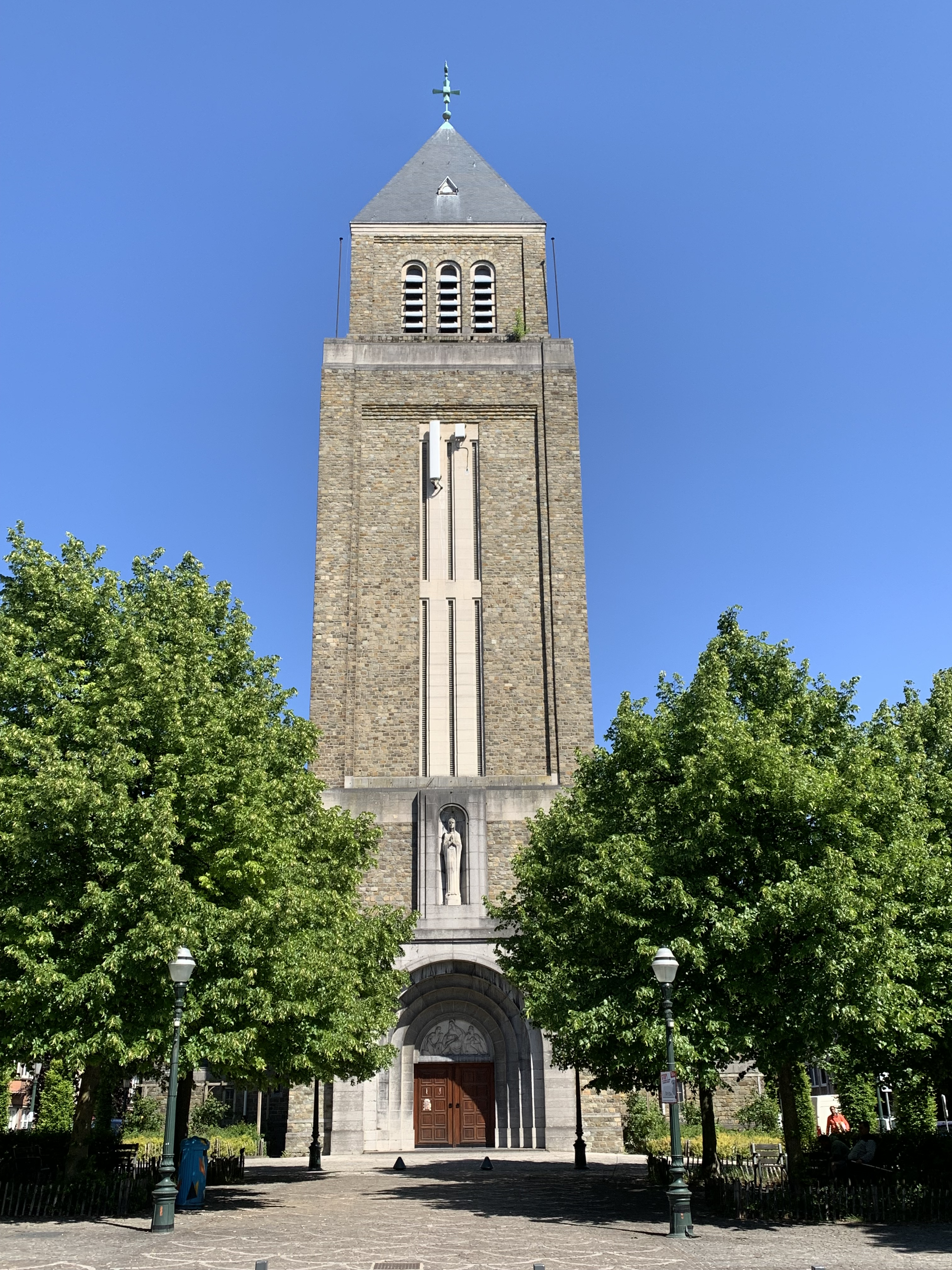
Church of Our Lady of Lourdes

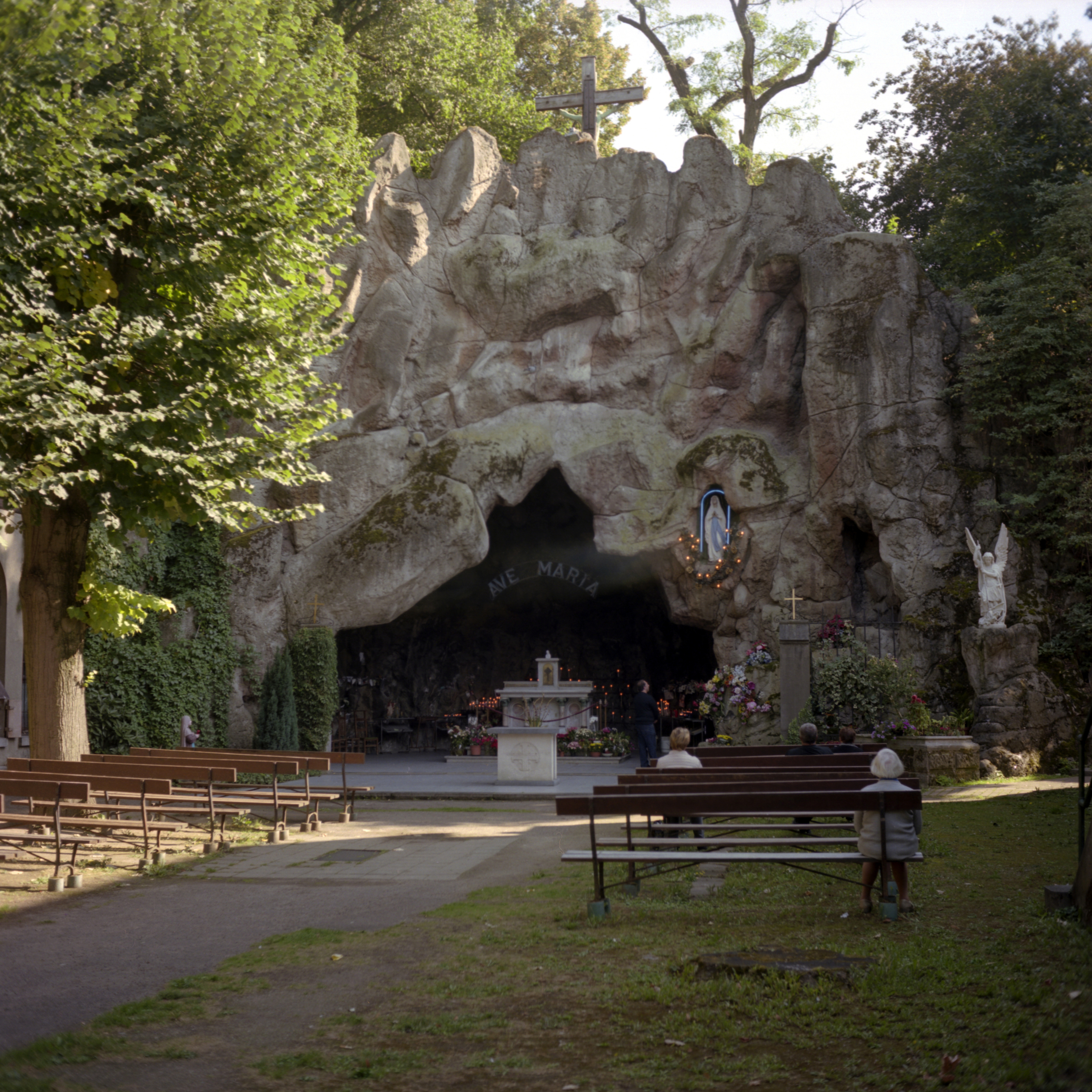
Our Lady of Lourdes Grotto

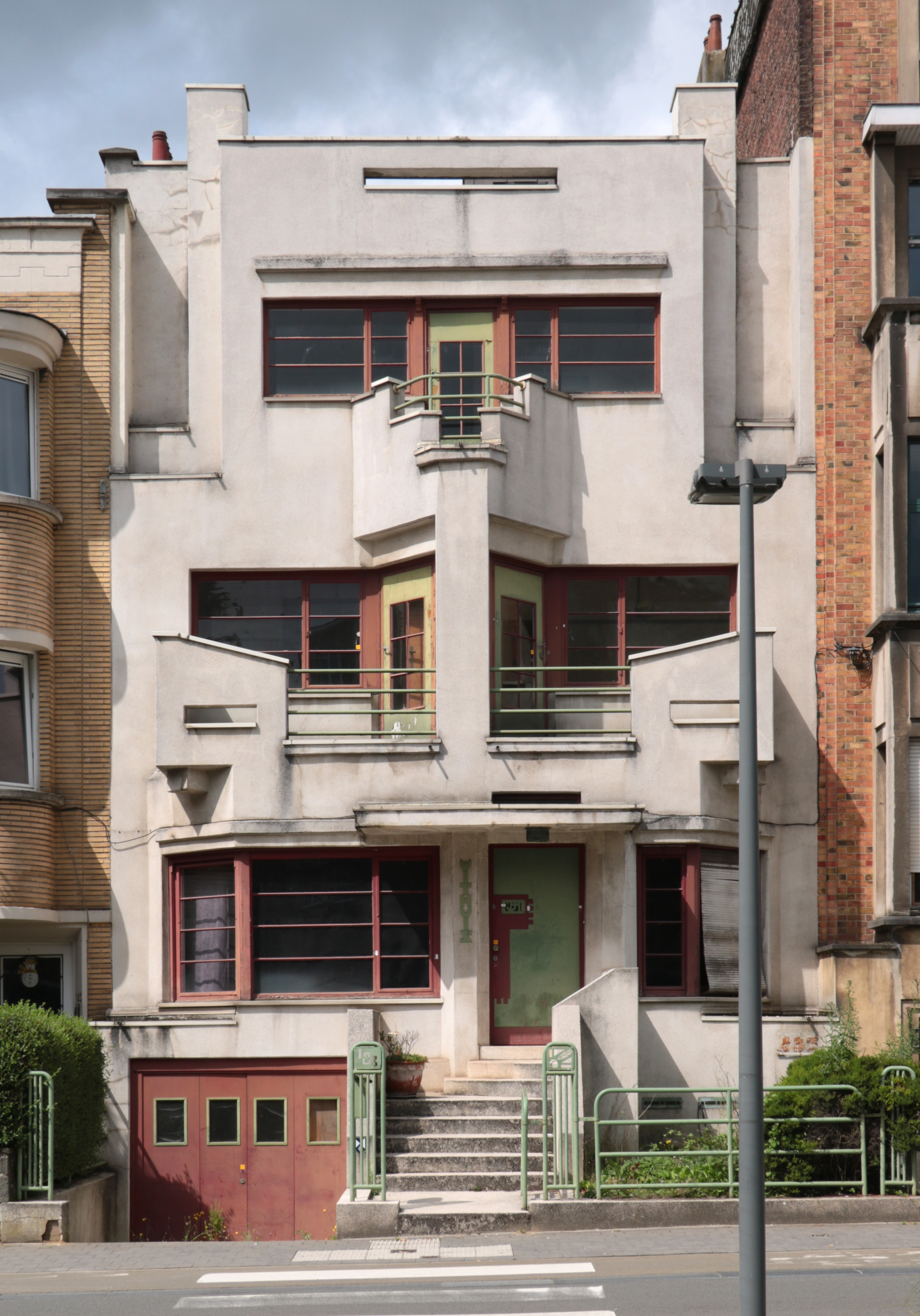
Withuis

==== Dieleghem/Dielegem ====
Located to the north of the historical centre of Jette, this district was built around the former Dieleghem Abbey. The neighbourhood used to be an independent municipality in the 18th century. It is bordered by Dieleghem Wood.

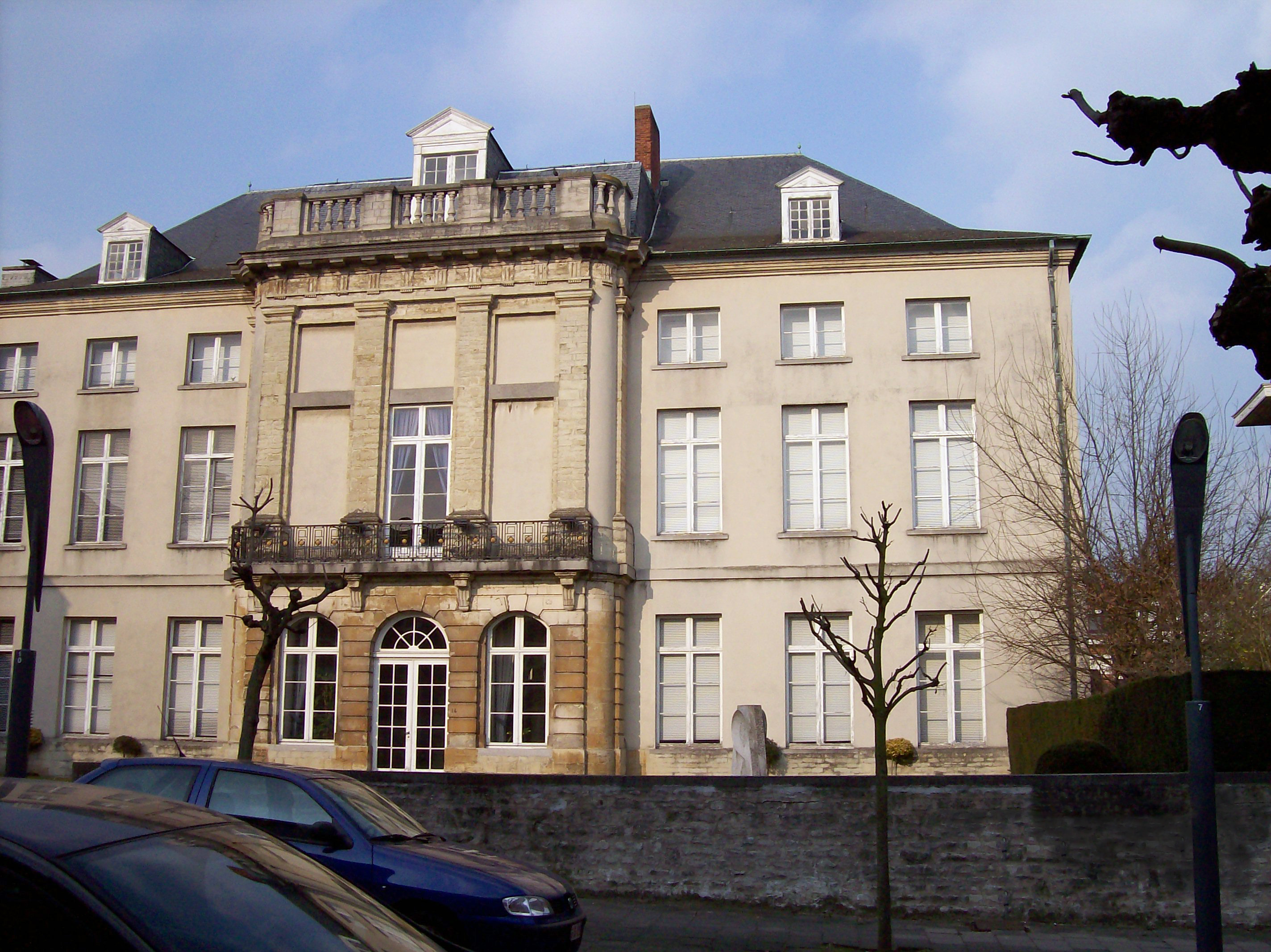
Abbot's mansion of Dieleghem Abbey

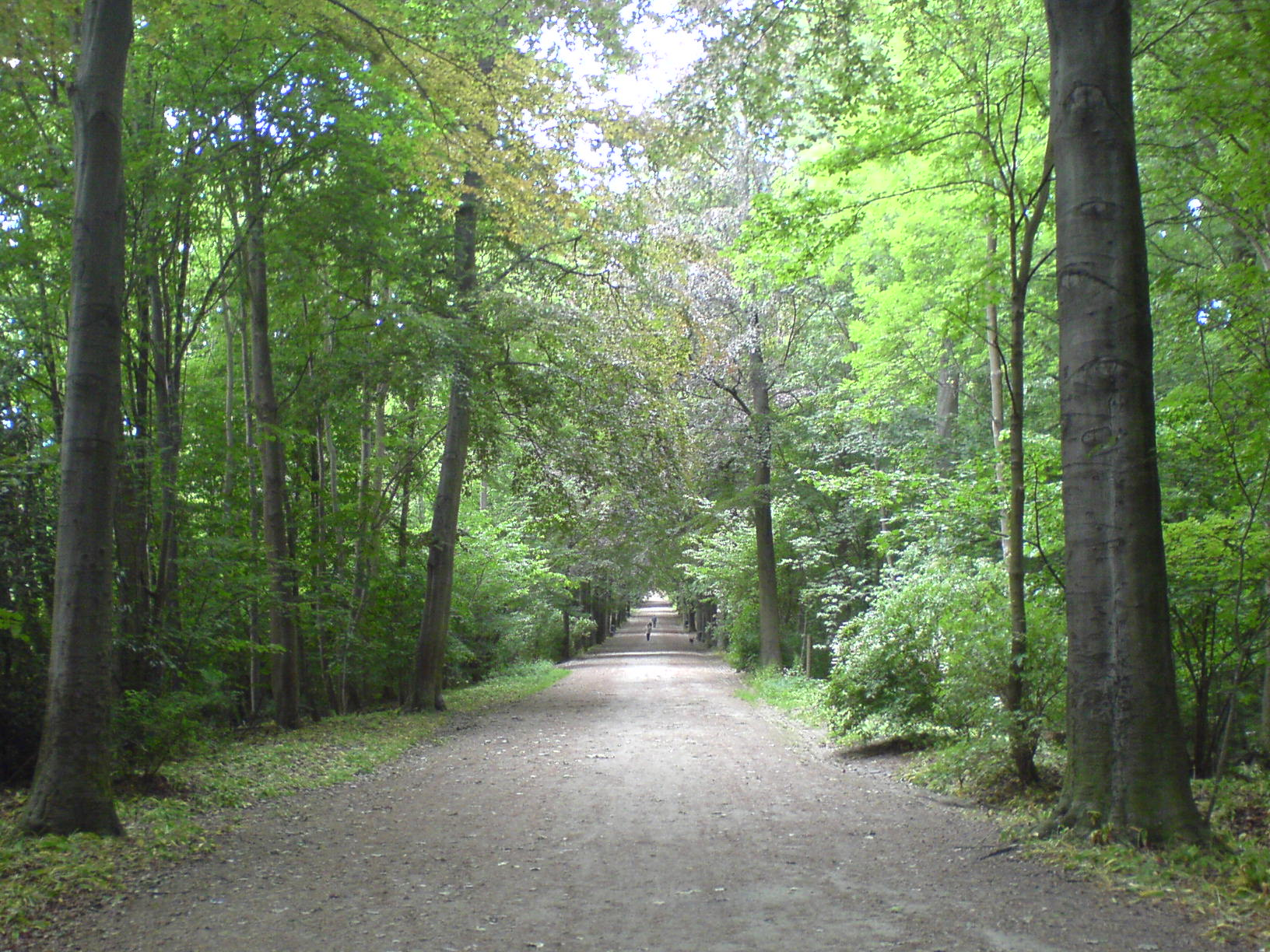
Dieleghem Wood

==== Heymbosch ====
Located in the north of Jette.

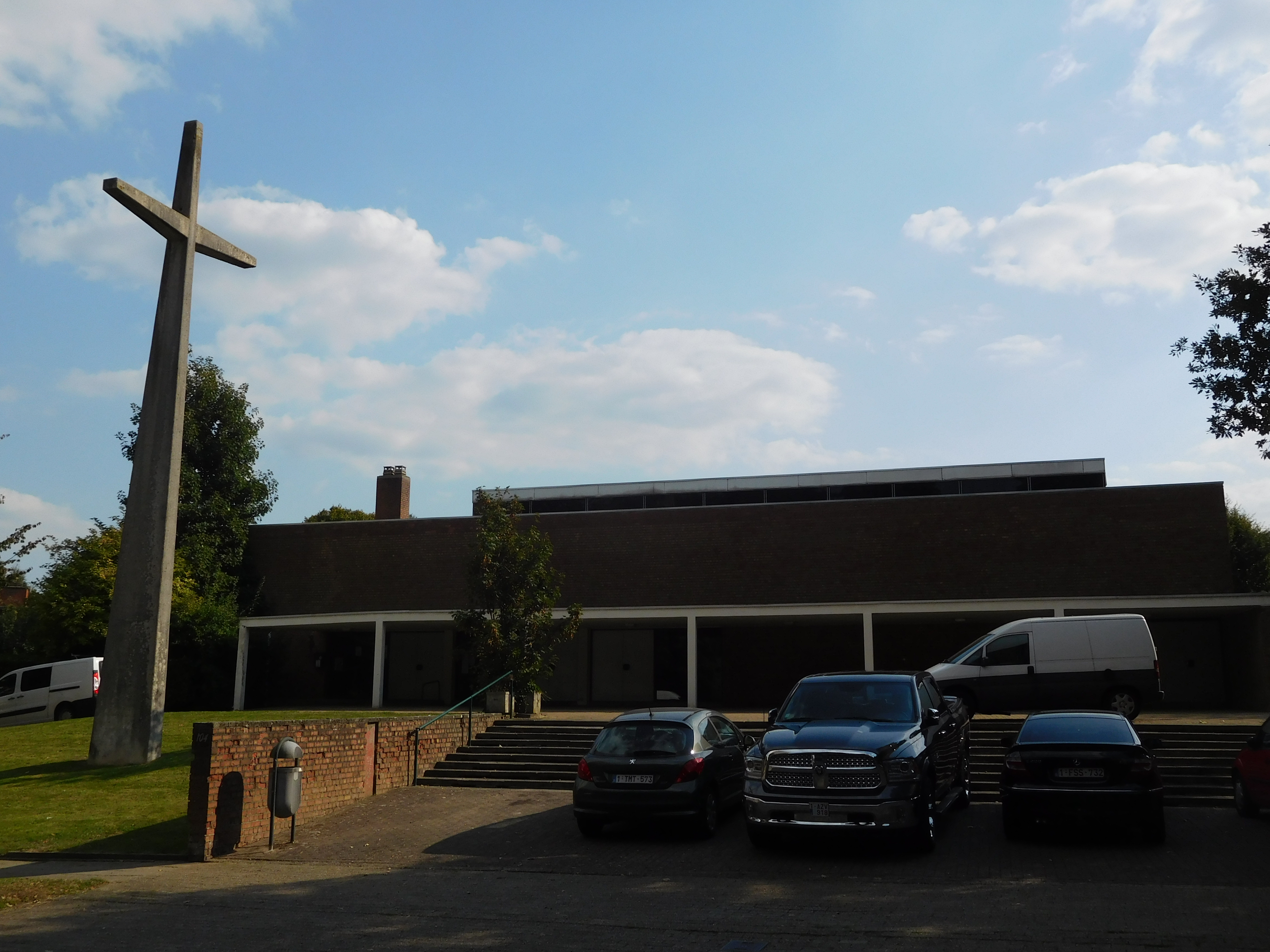
Church of St. Clare

==== Jette Gardens ====
Located in the north of Jette, between the Avenue de l'Arbre Ballon/Dikke-Beuklaan and the Avenue de l'Exposition/Tentoonstellingslaan, Jette Gardens is a modern residential enclave developed in the early 1990s. This district, which contrasts with the modernist high-rise buildings from the 1960s on the other side of Avenue de l'Exposition, features tree-lined streets and a calm suburban atmosphere. At its centre lies the Place du Bourgmestre Jean-Louis Thys/Burgemeester Jean-Louis Thysplein, named in honour of the former mayor of Jette who instigated these works. Thematically, most of the street names are dedicated to figures of cinema, interspersed with some other past mayors of Jette.

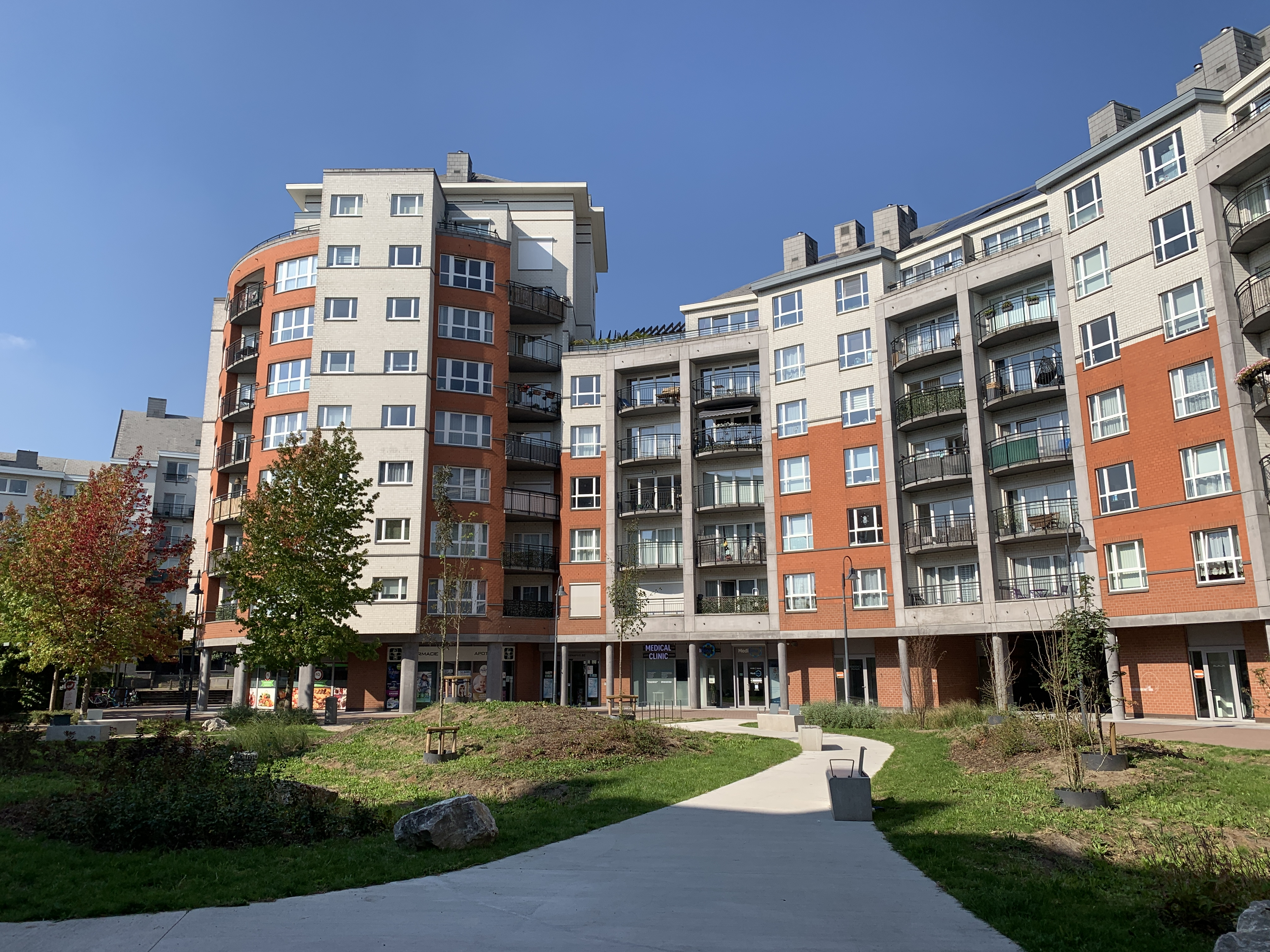
Place du Bourgmestre Jean-Louis Thys/Burgemeester Jean-Louis Thysplein

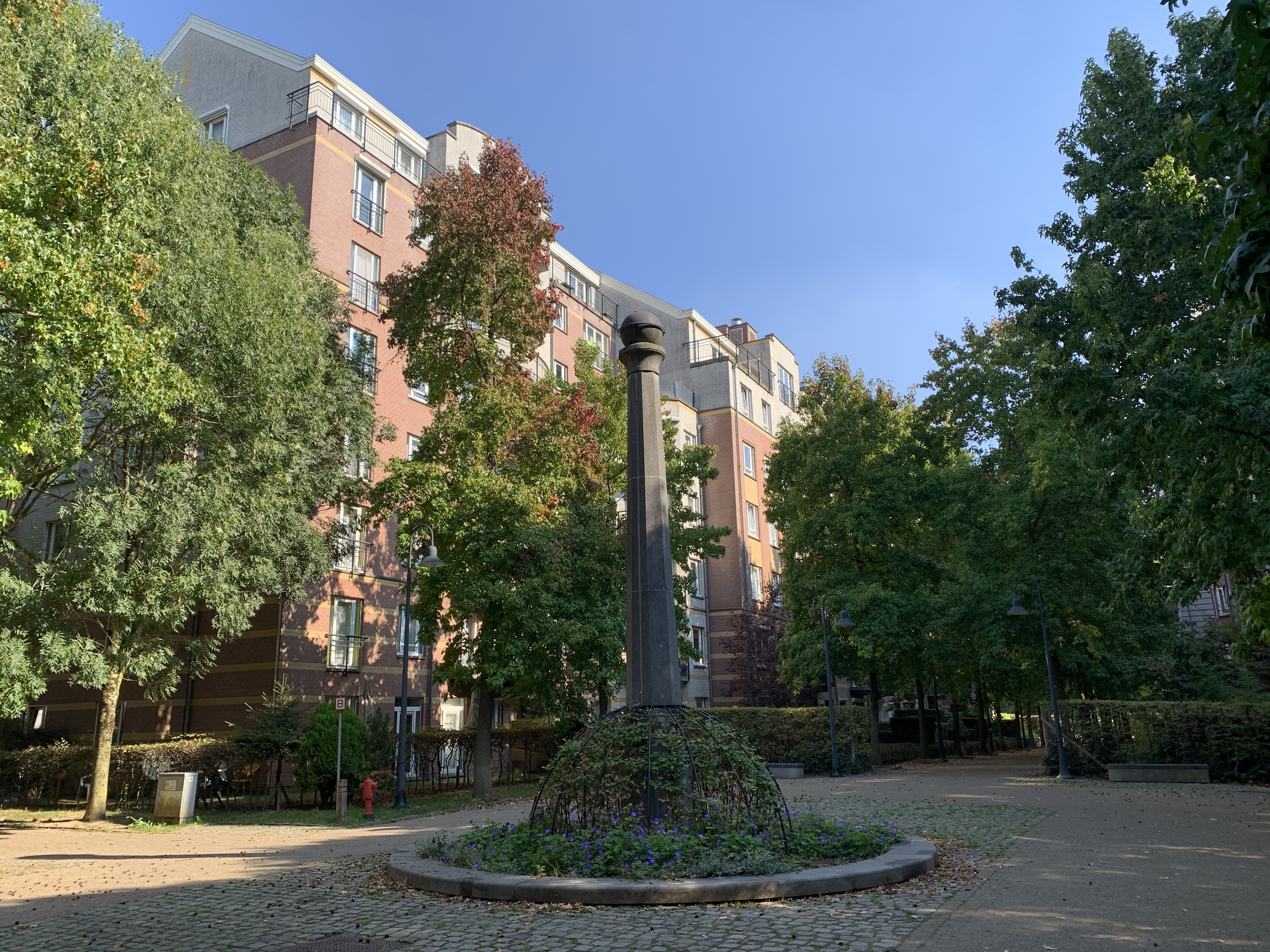
Chemin Bourvil/Bourvilweg

==== Laerbeek/Laarbeek ====
Located in the north-west of Jette, this district is mainly covered by the Laerbeek Wood and includes the semi-natural site of the Poelbos and parts of the Jette-Ganshoren Marsh. These green spaces are bordered by the King Baudouin Park beyond the Avenue de l'Exposition, forming a green corridor that crosses the municipality from west to east. The northern part adjoins a large multifunctional site that comprises the Jette campus of the Vrije Universiteit Brussel (VUB) and the Erasmushogeschool Brussel (EhB), as well as hospital buildings of the Universitair Ziekenhuis Brussel (UZ Brussel).

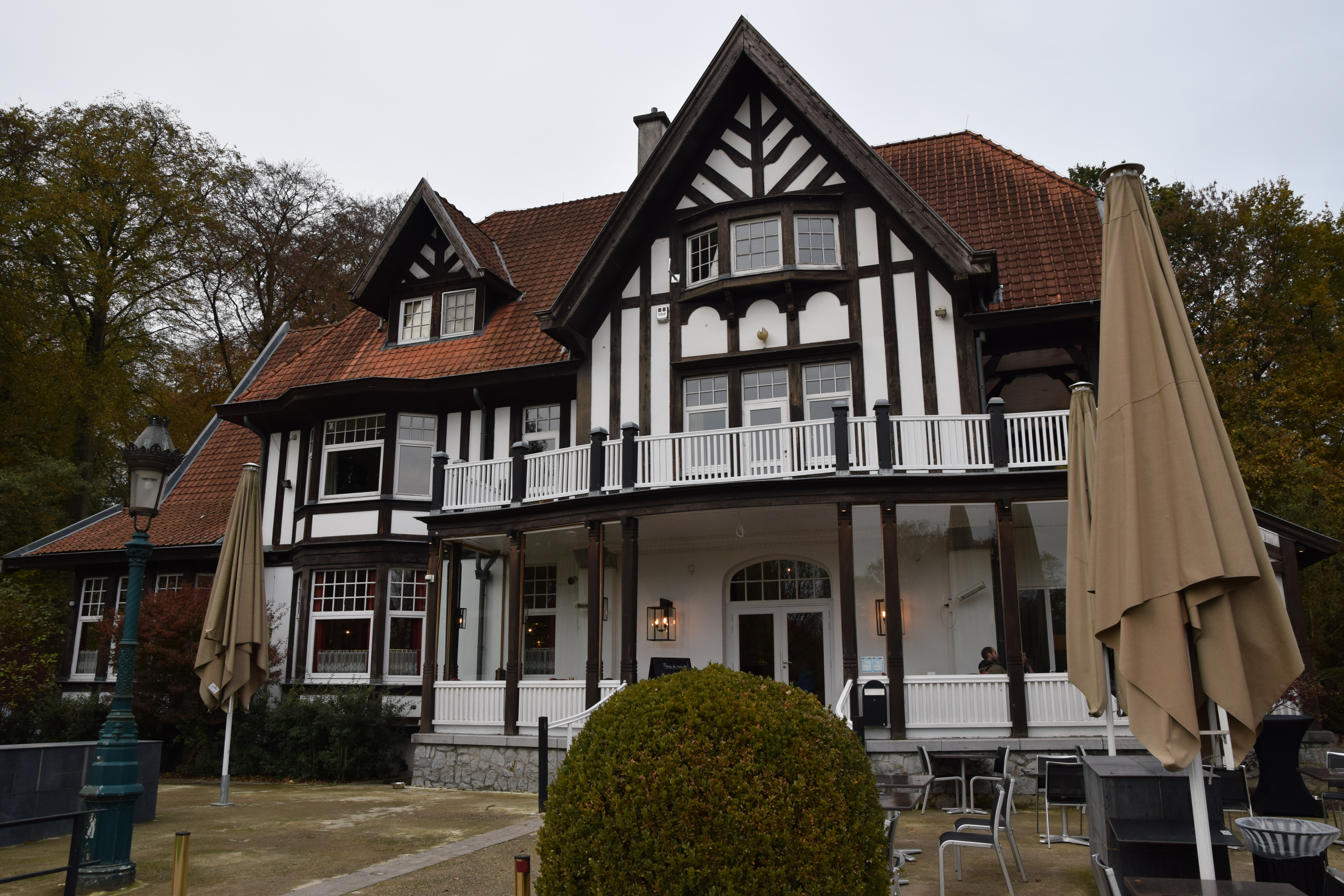
Chalet du Laerbeek

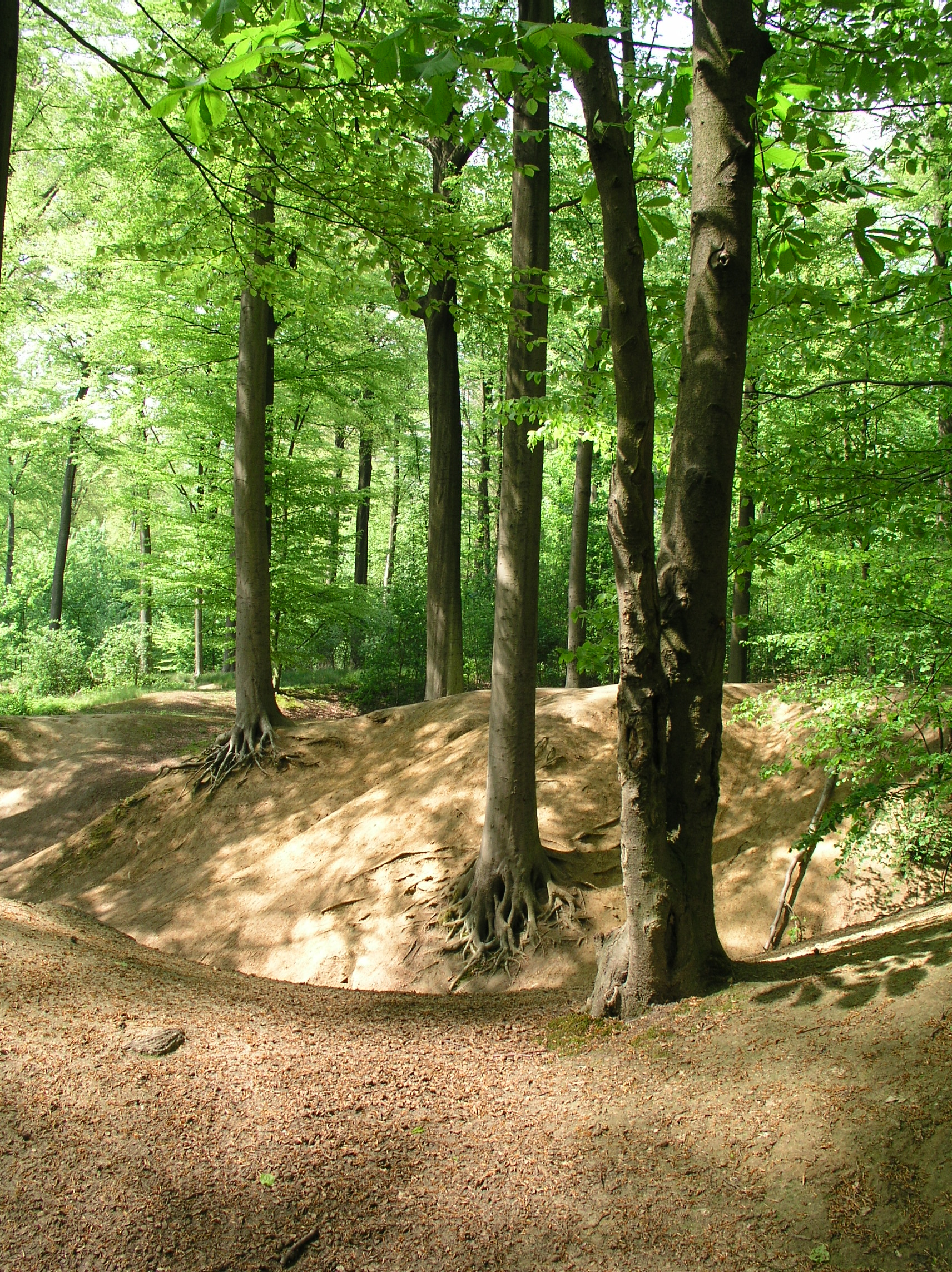
Laerbeek Wood

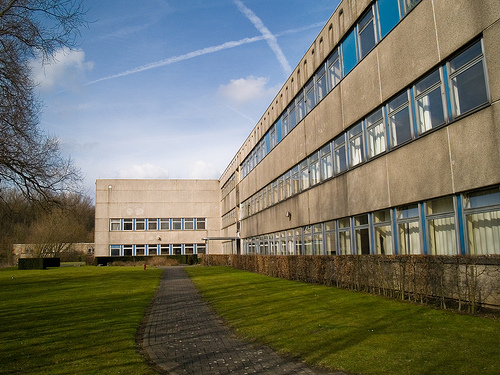
Jette campus of Erasmushogeschool Brussel (EhB)

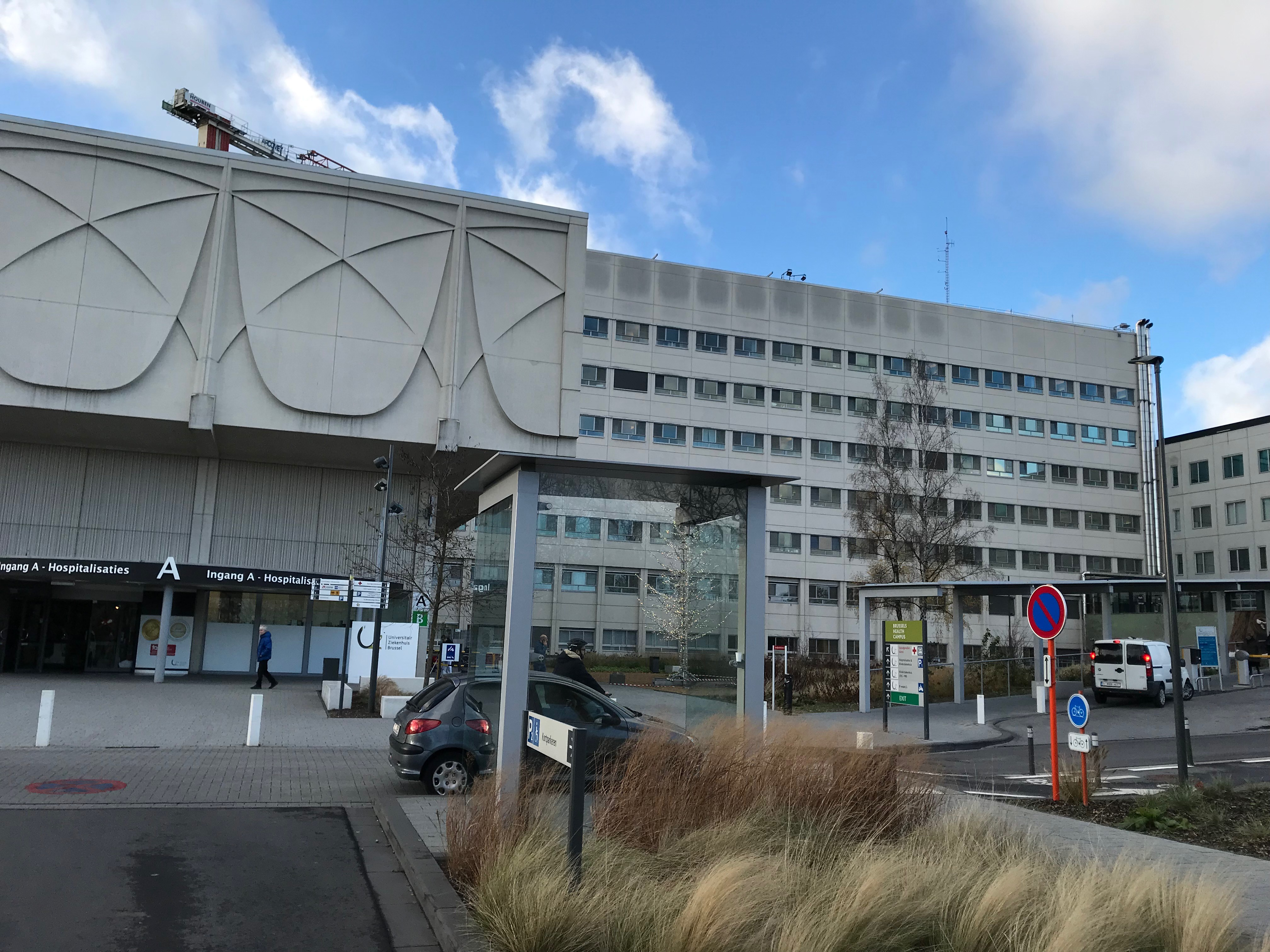
UZ Brussel

=== Koekelberg ===
==== Historical centre ====
The historical centre of Koekelberg is the municipality's central district, located east of the railway and metro lines. It was largely urbanised from the mid-19th century, starting from the initial hamlet of Koekelberg. The urban fabric, composed mainly of workers' houses and small apartment buildings, forms a continuity with the working-class neighbourhood of historical Molenbeek-Saint-Jean. The Municipal Hall of Koekelberg is located on the Place Henri Vanhuffel/Henri Vanhuffelplein, in the heart of this district.

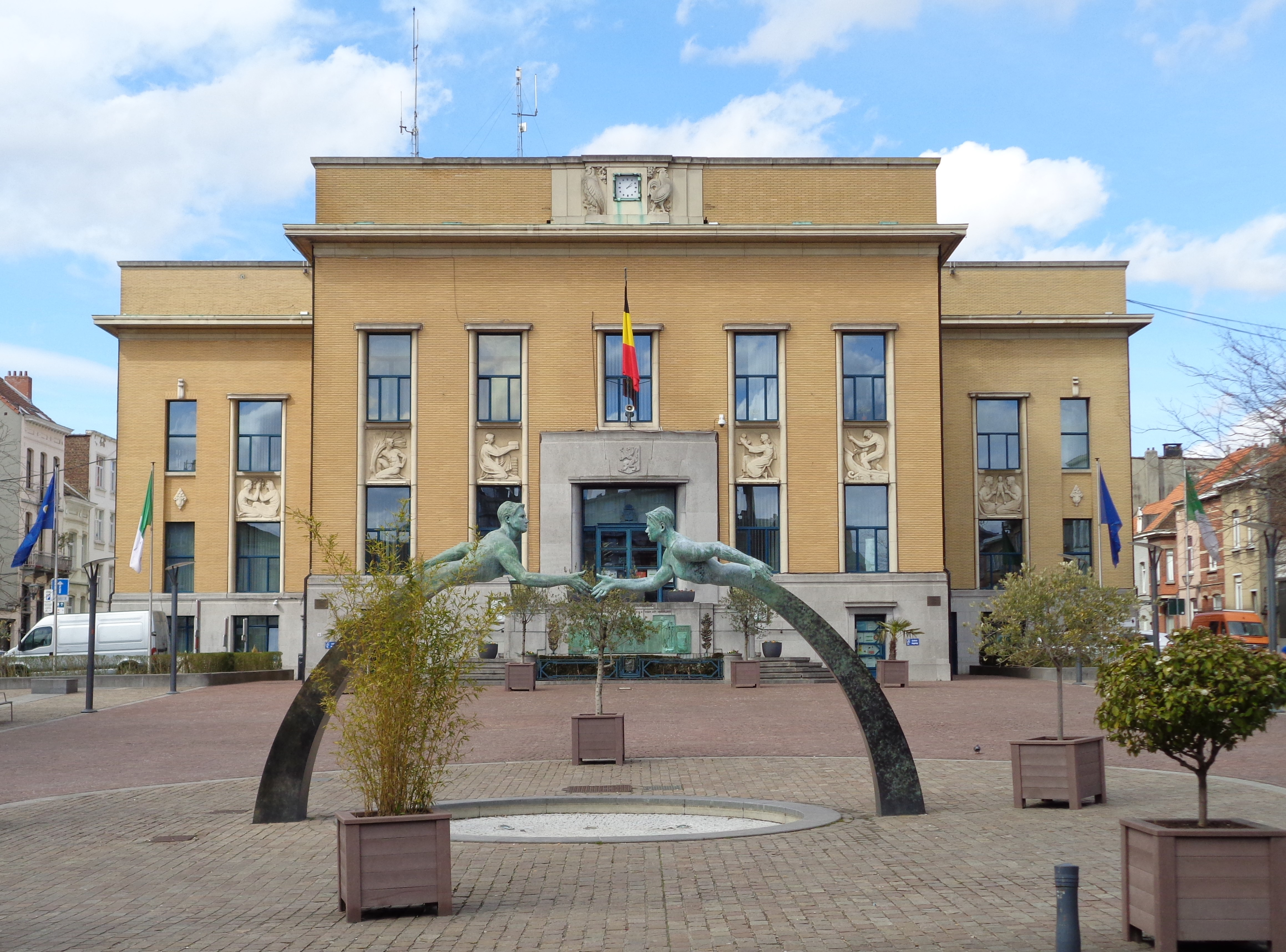
Koekelberg's Municipal Hall

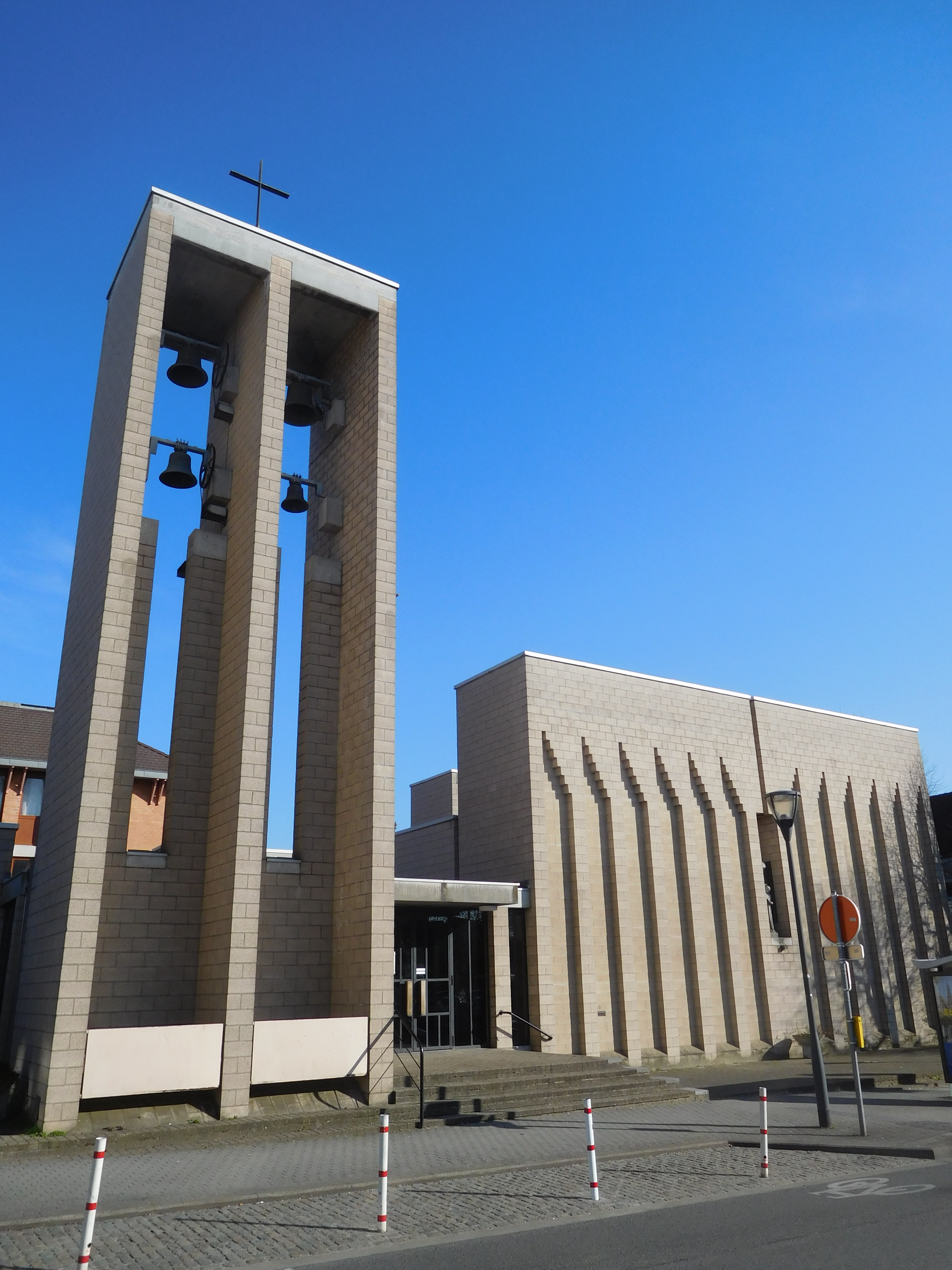
Church of St. Anne

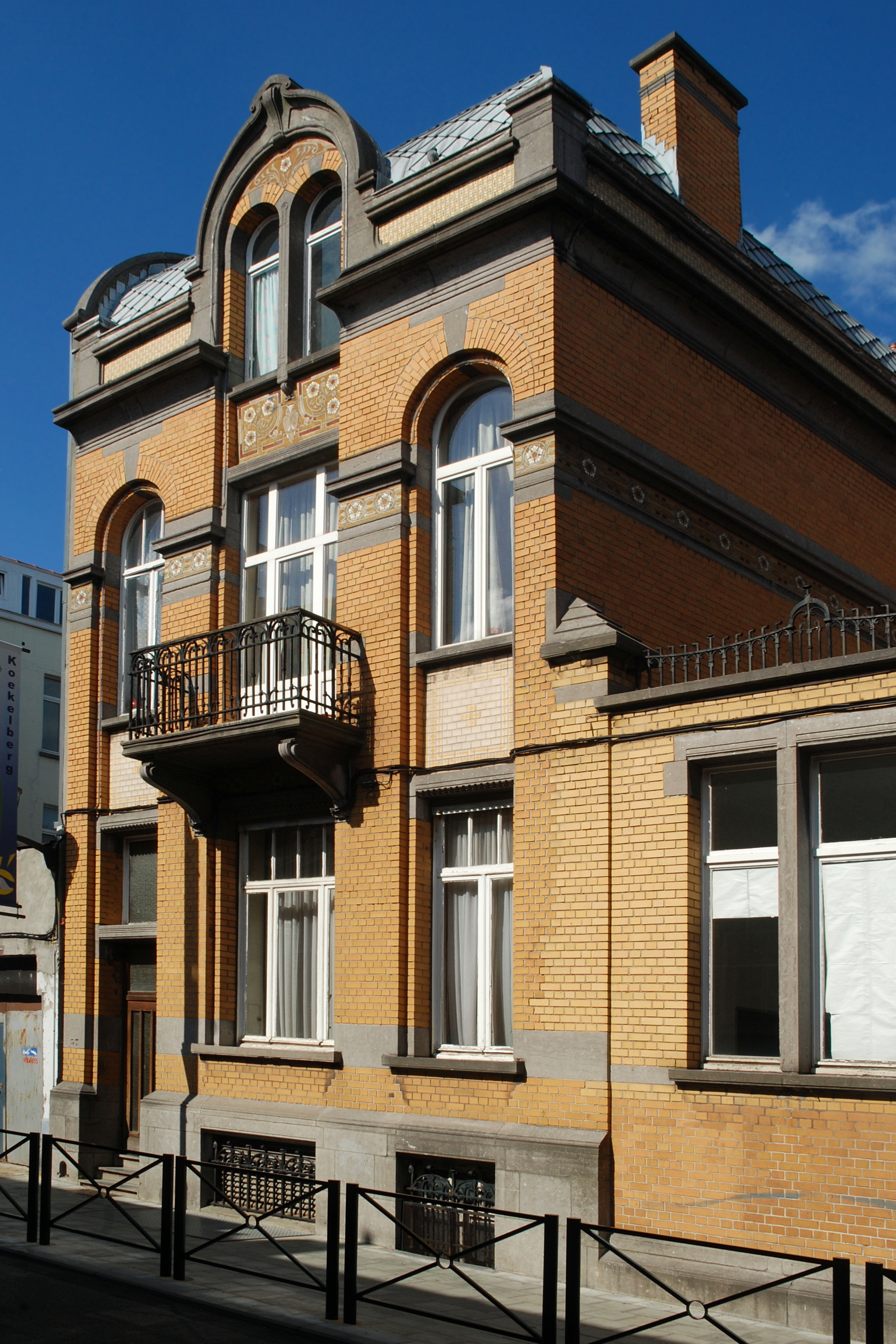
Municipal School no. 37

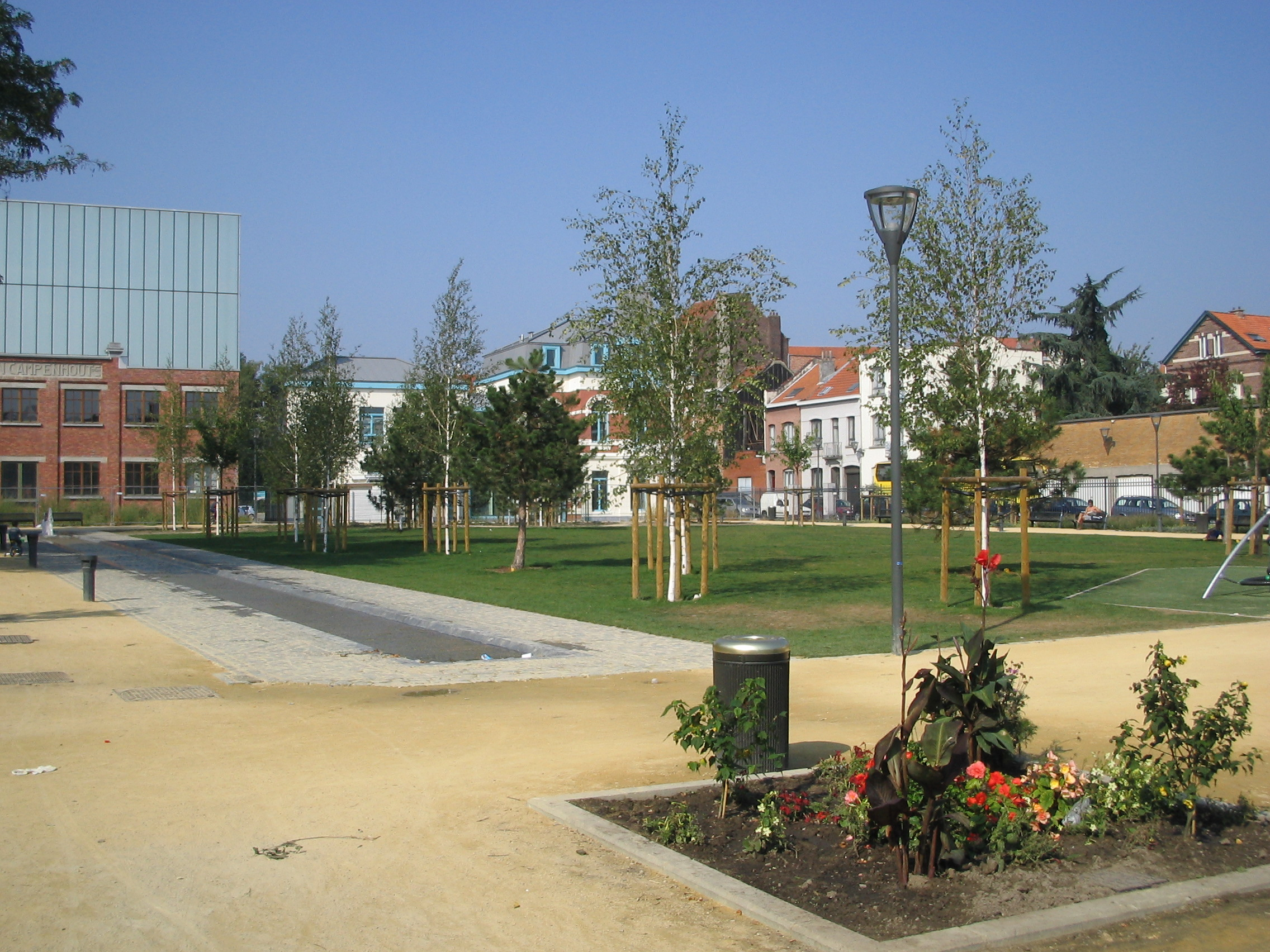
Victoria Park

==== Basilica Quarter (Elisabeth) ====
Located in the upper part of Koekelberg, the Basilica Quarter (French: Quartier Basilique, Dutch: Basiliekwijk) is dominated by the National Basilica of the Sacred Heart (or Koekelberg Basilica), one of the largest churches in the world. This residential district has many bel-étage dwellings, small apartment buildings, as well as town houses, mainly around Elisabeth Park.

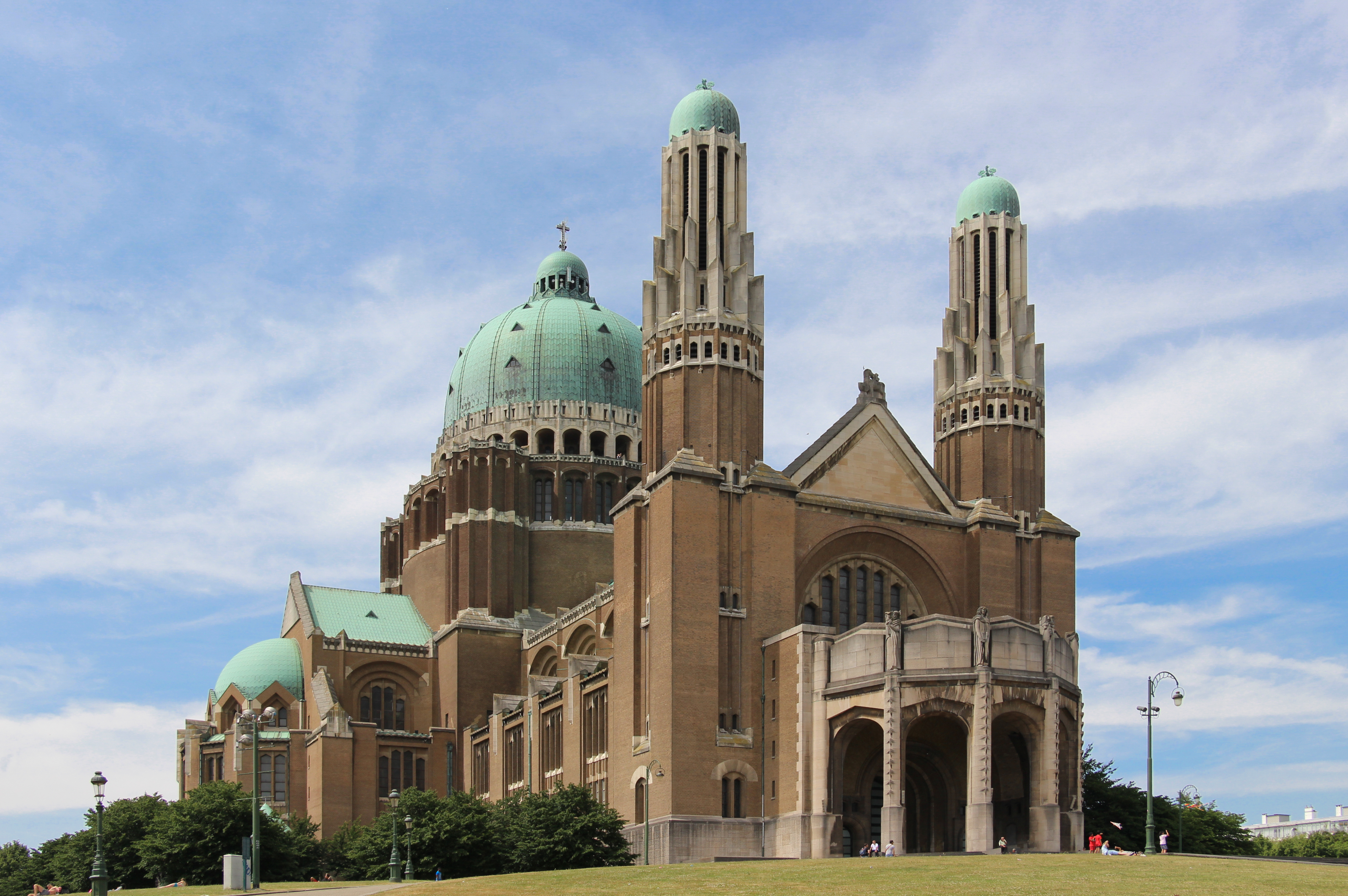
National Basilica of the Sacred Heart

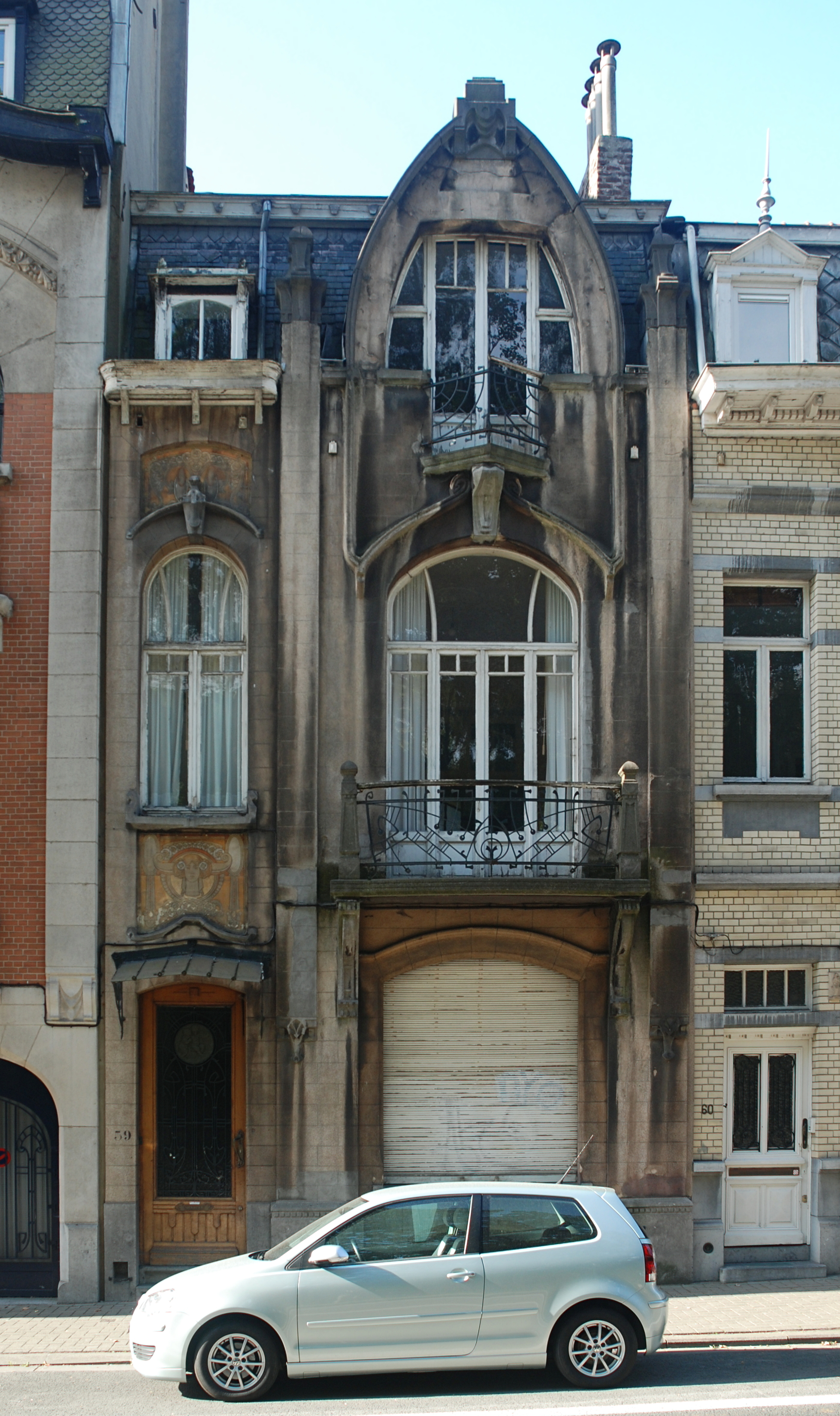
Lefever House

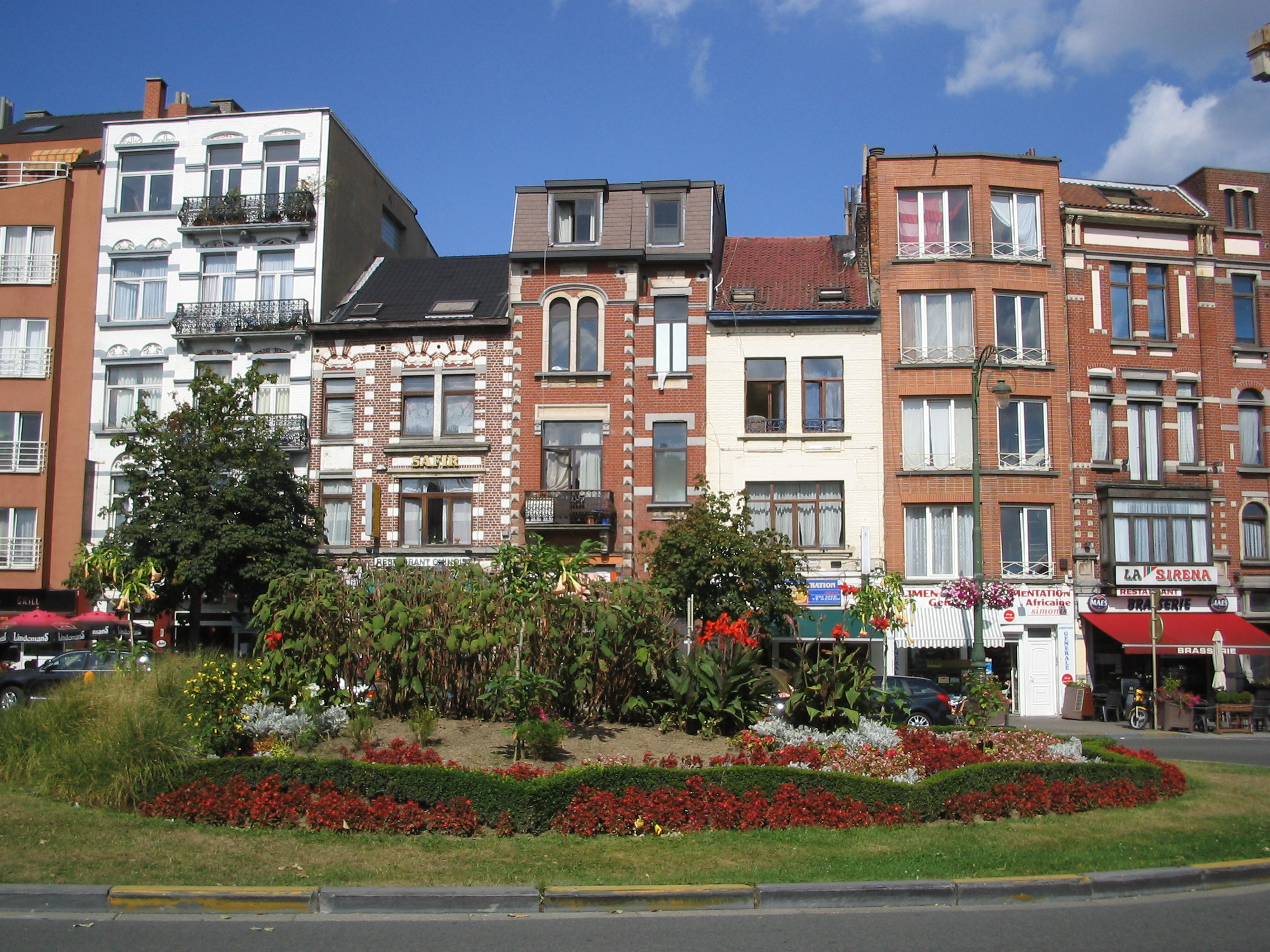
Place Eugène Simonis/Eugène Simonisplein

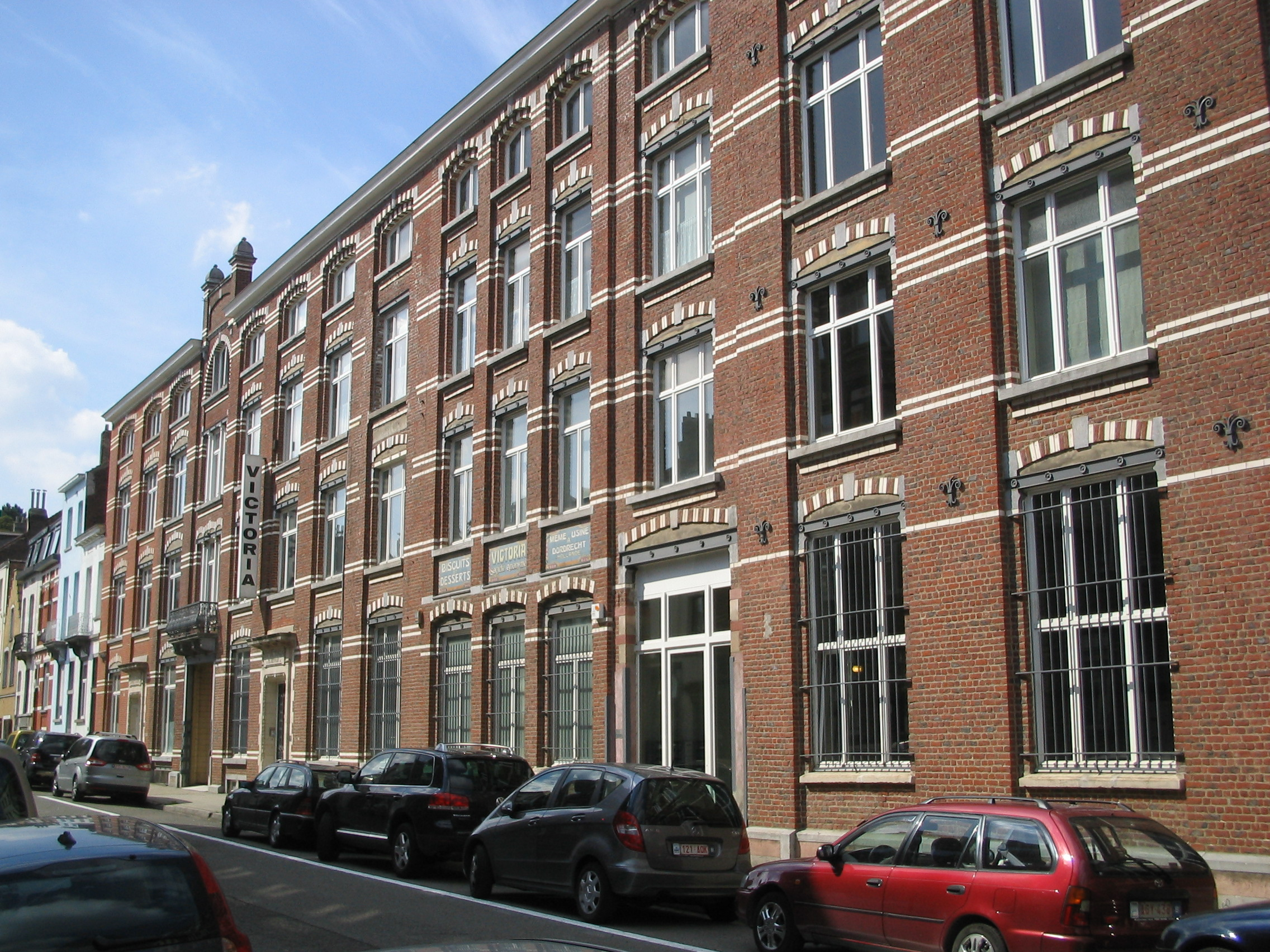
Belgian Chocolate Village

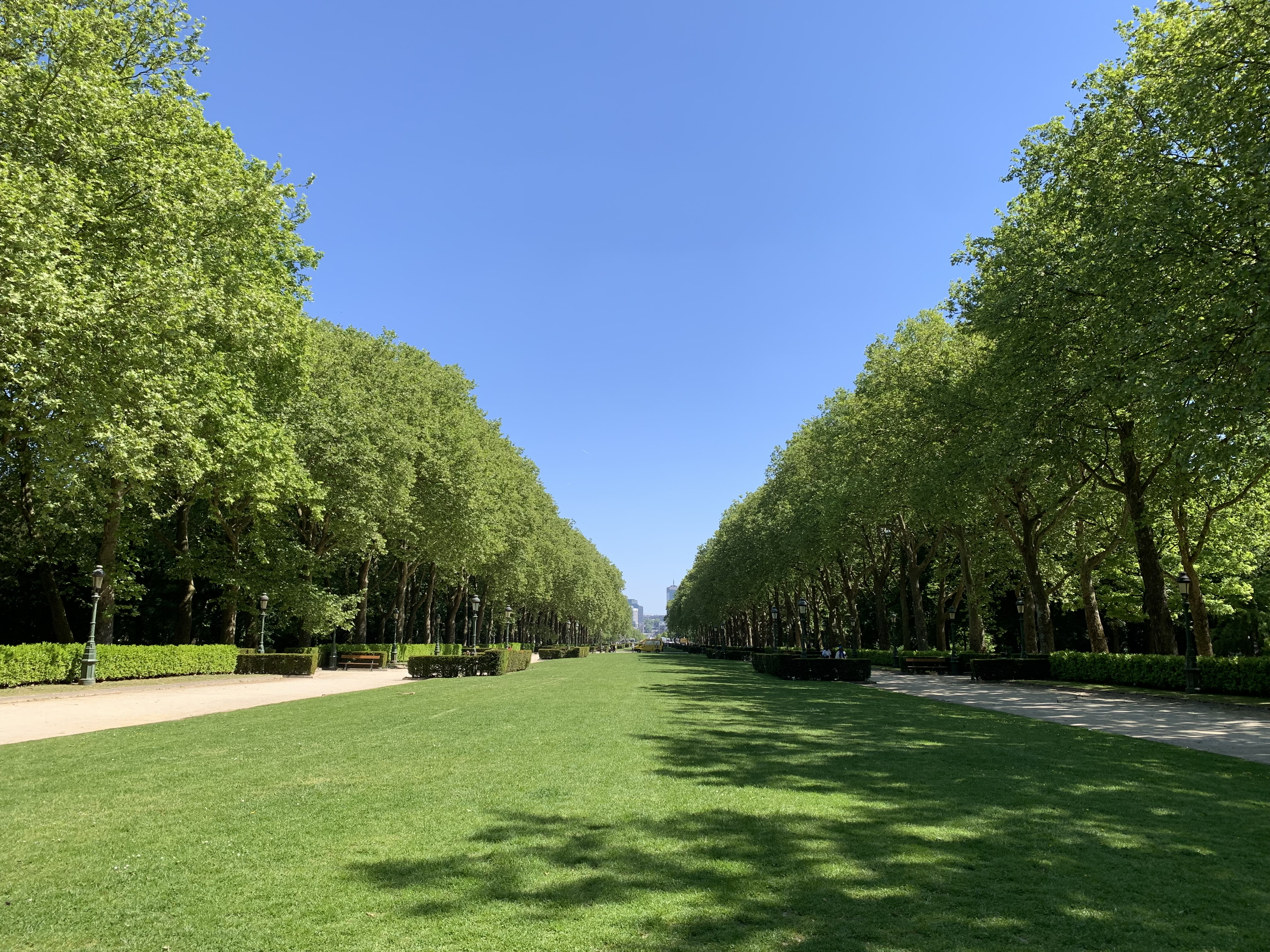
Elisabeth Park

=== Molenbeek-Saint-Jean/Sint-Jans-Molenbeek ===
==== Historical centre ====
The historical centre of Molenbeek-Saint-Jean, sometimes referred to as Old Molenbeek, is the municipality's central district. It is bounded by the Brussels–Charleroi Canal to the east and by the Boulevard Léopold II/Leopold II-laan to the north, with the Chaussée de Gand/Gentsesteenweg as its central artery. It grew up around the medieval village core, located on the site of the present-day Parvis Saint Jean-Baptiste/Sint-Jan-Baptistvoorplein. Like Cureghem, it was once a centre of intense industrial activity, concentrated around the canal. Landmarks from this period include the Brussels Museum of Industry and Labour, a former foundry, and the Gosset factory with its Art Deco/modernist architecture, several former breweries converted into hotels (Hôtel Belvue) or event venues (Brussels Event Brewery), as well as many private lofts. The Municipal Hall of Molenbeek is located on the Place Communale/Gemeenteplein ("Municipal Square"), in the heart of this district.

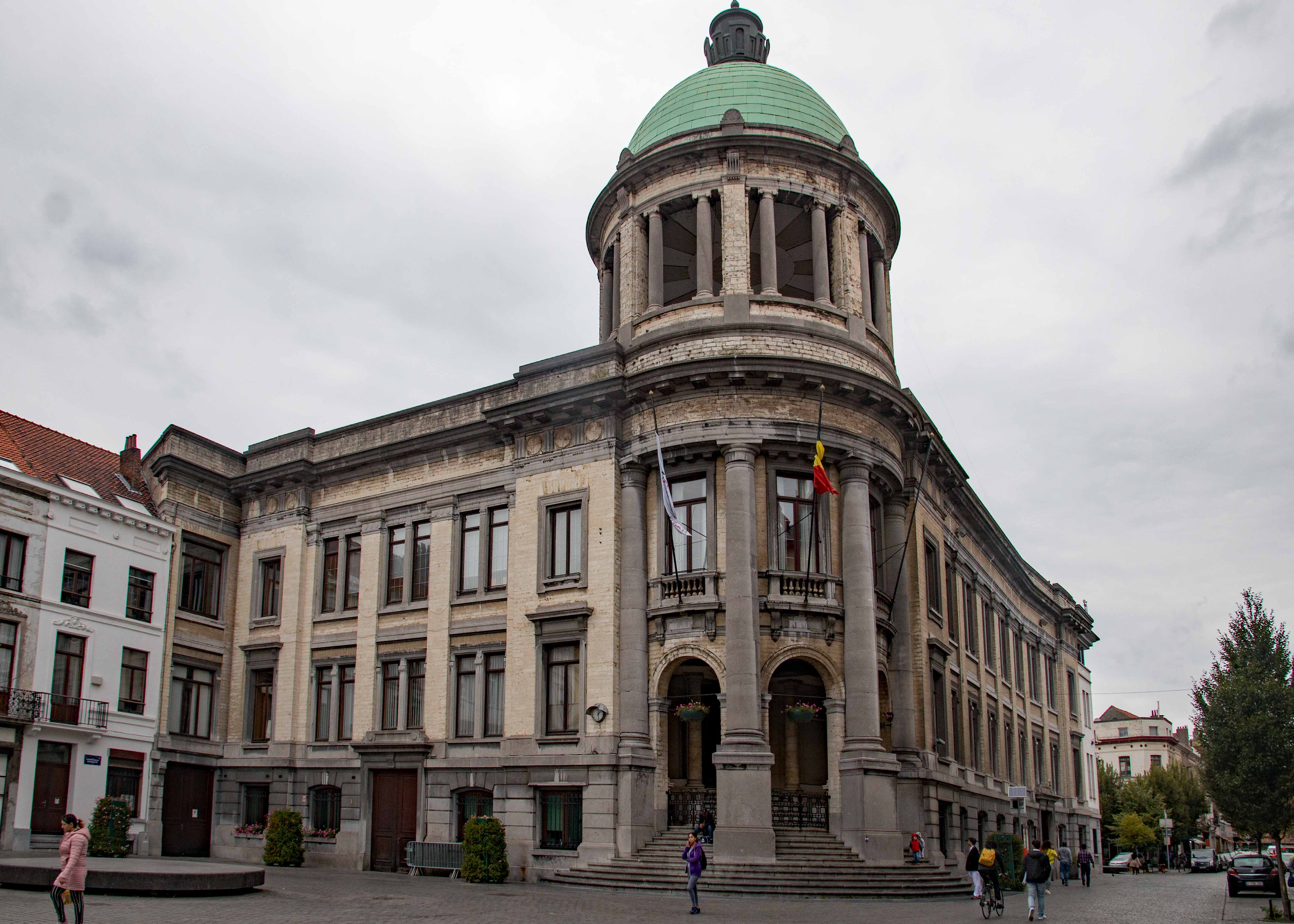
Molenbeek-Saint-Jean's Municipal Hall

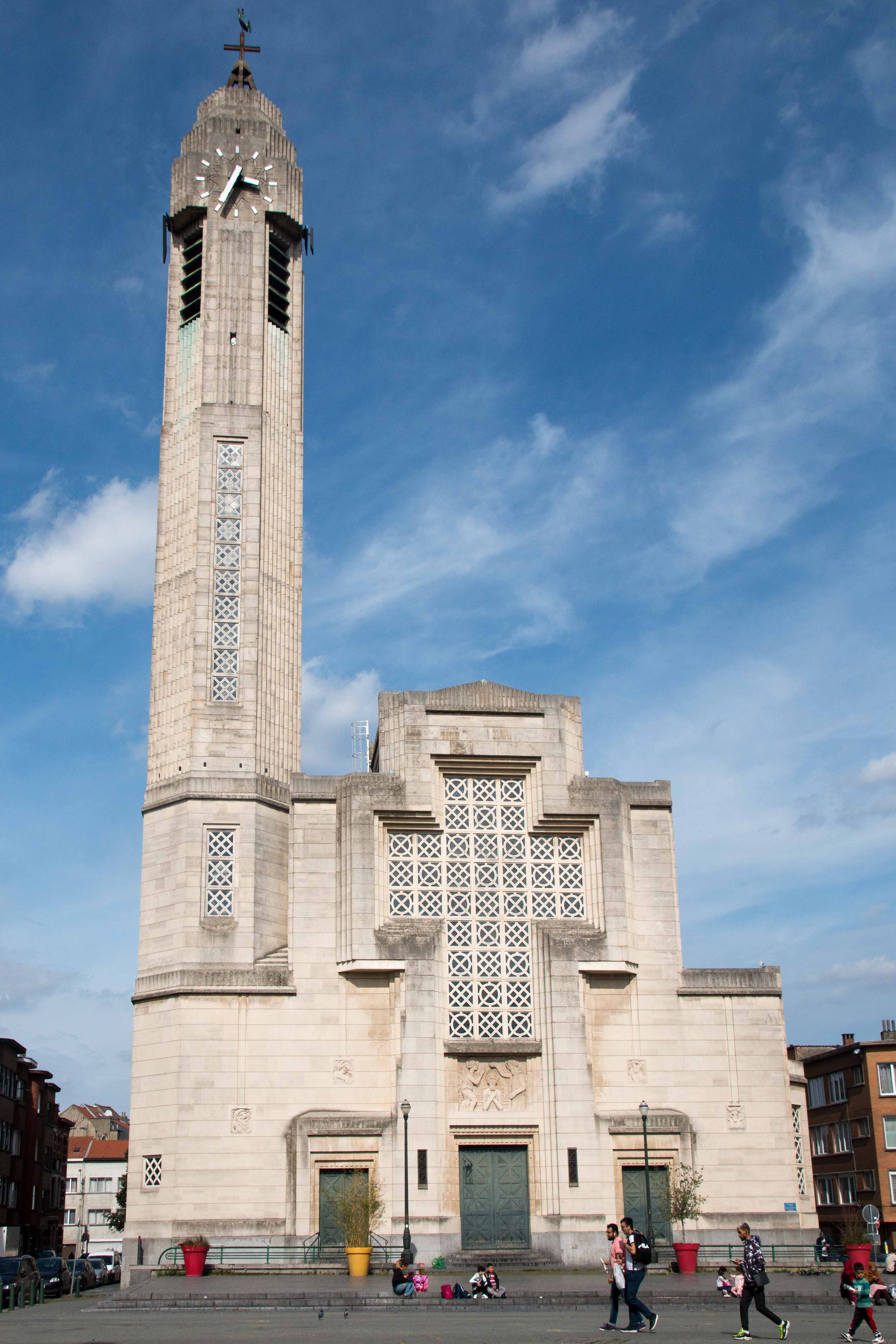
Church of St. John the Baptist

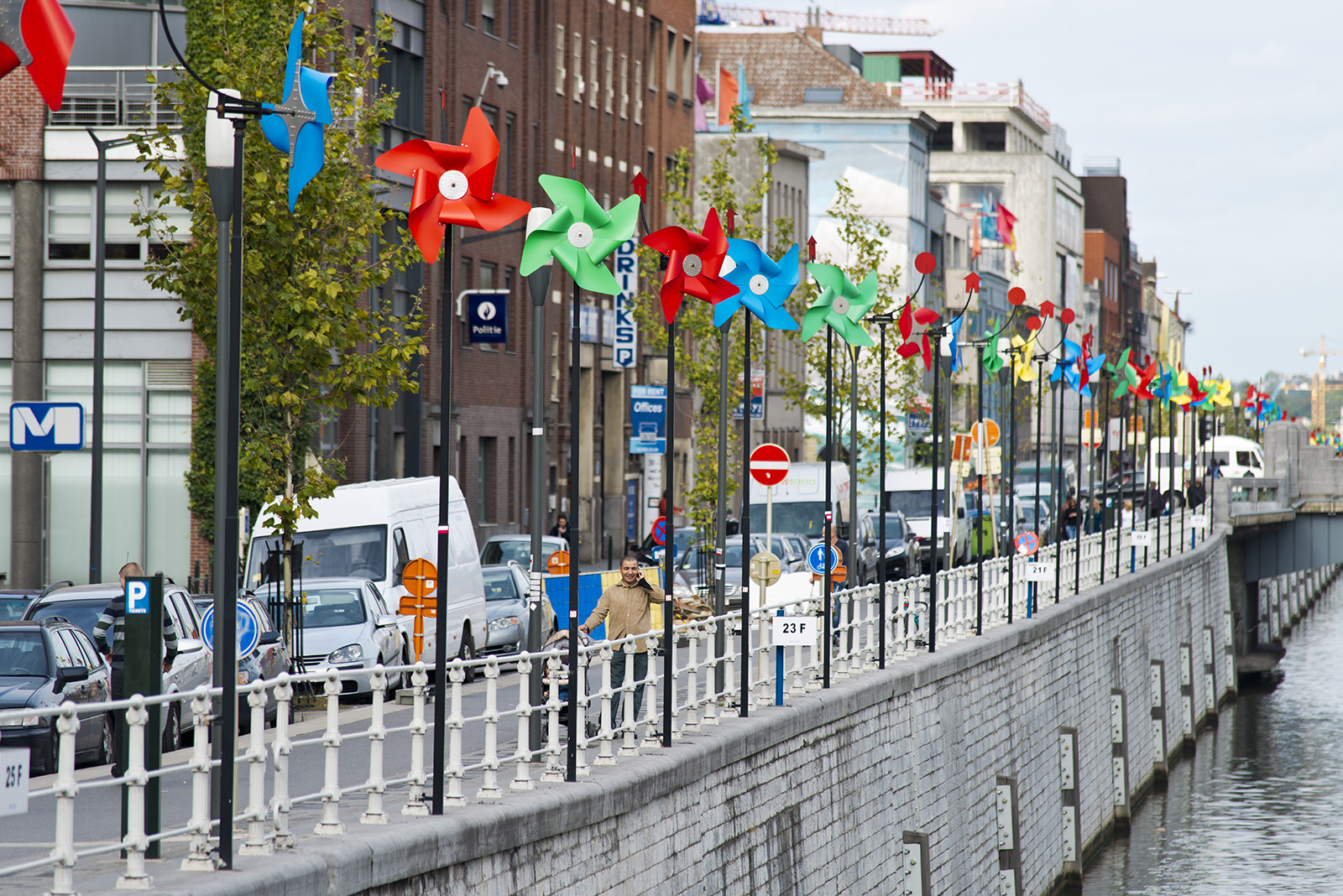
Pinwheels along the canal in Molenbeek

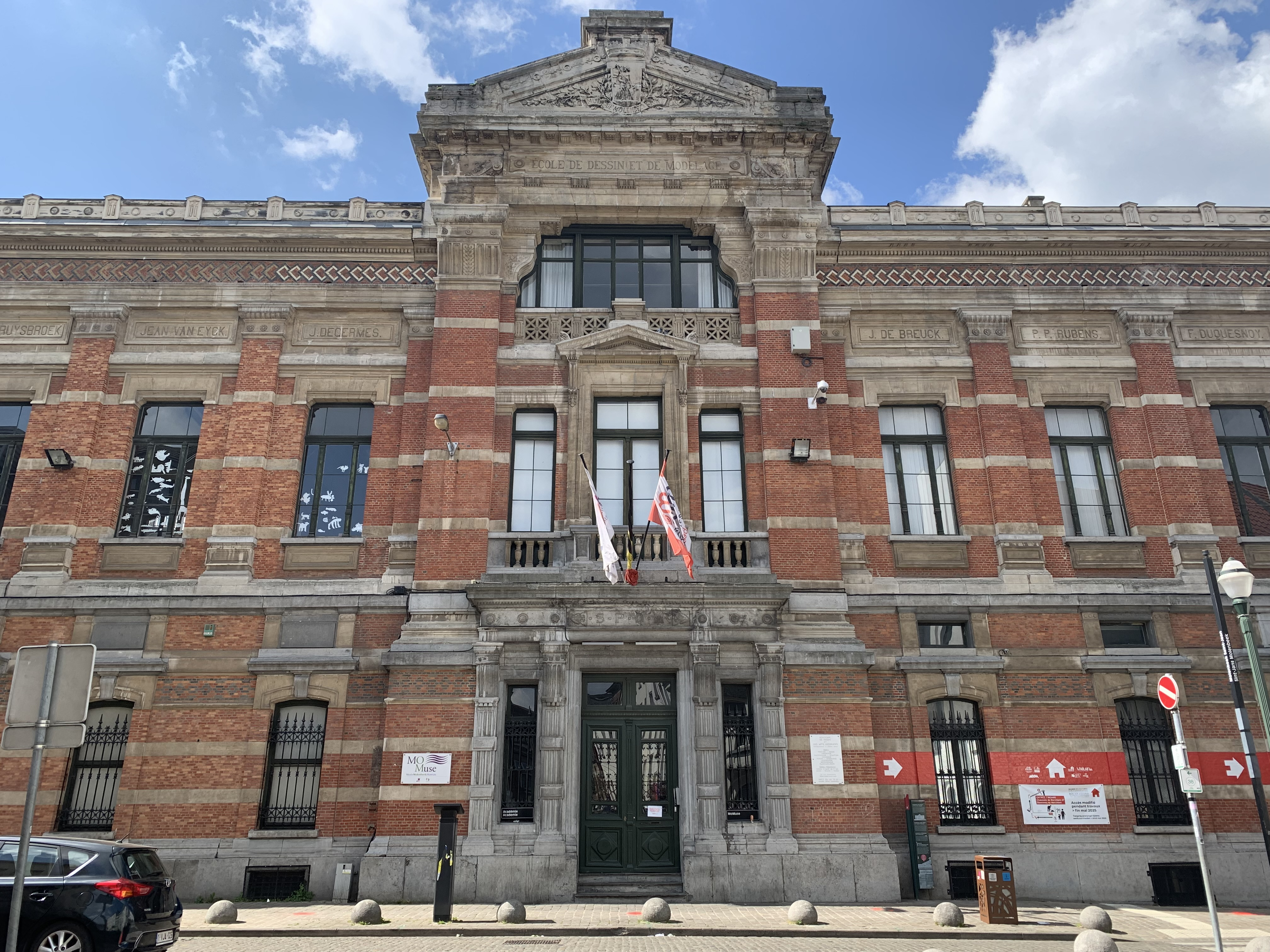
Molenbeek Academy of Drawing and Visual Arts

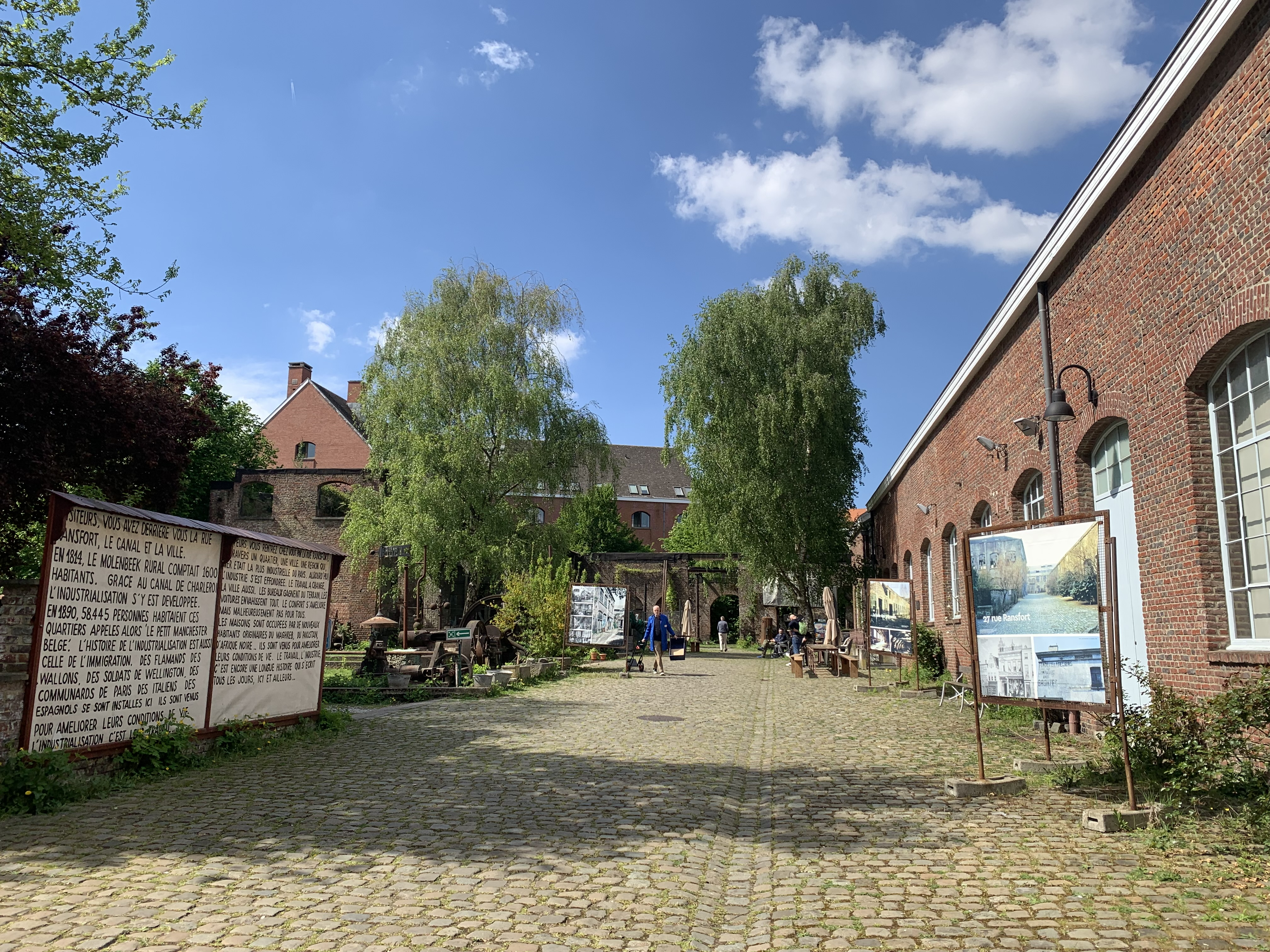
La Fonderie, Brussels Museum of Industry and Labour

==== Duchesse (Quatre-vents) ====
Located to the south of the historical centre of Molenbeek, this district is centred on the Place de la Duchesse de Brabant/Hertogin van Brabantplein. The square was created in 1847 on the grounds of the Hospices de Bruxelles, of which only the neoclassical façade remains. The hospice buildings now house a primary school (Municipal School no. 5). In 1869, the Church of St. Barbara was erected there for the Catholic worship of the new parish. The Rue de Birmingham/Birminghamstraat, the Rue de Manchester/Manchesterstraat, the Rue de la Princesse/Prinsesstraat, the Rue Vanderstraeten/Vanderstraetenstraat and the Rue Isidoor Teirlinck/Isidoor Teirlinckstraat also end there.

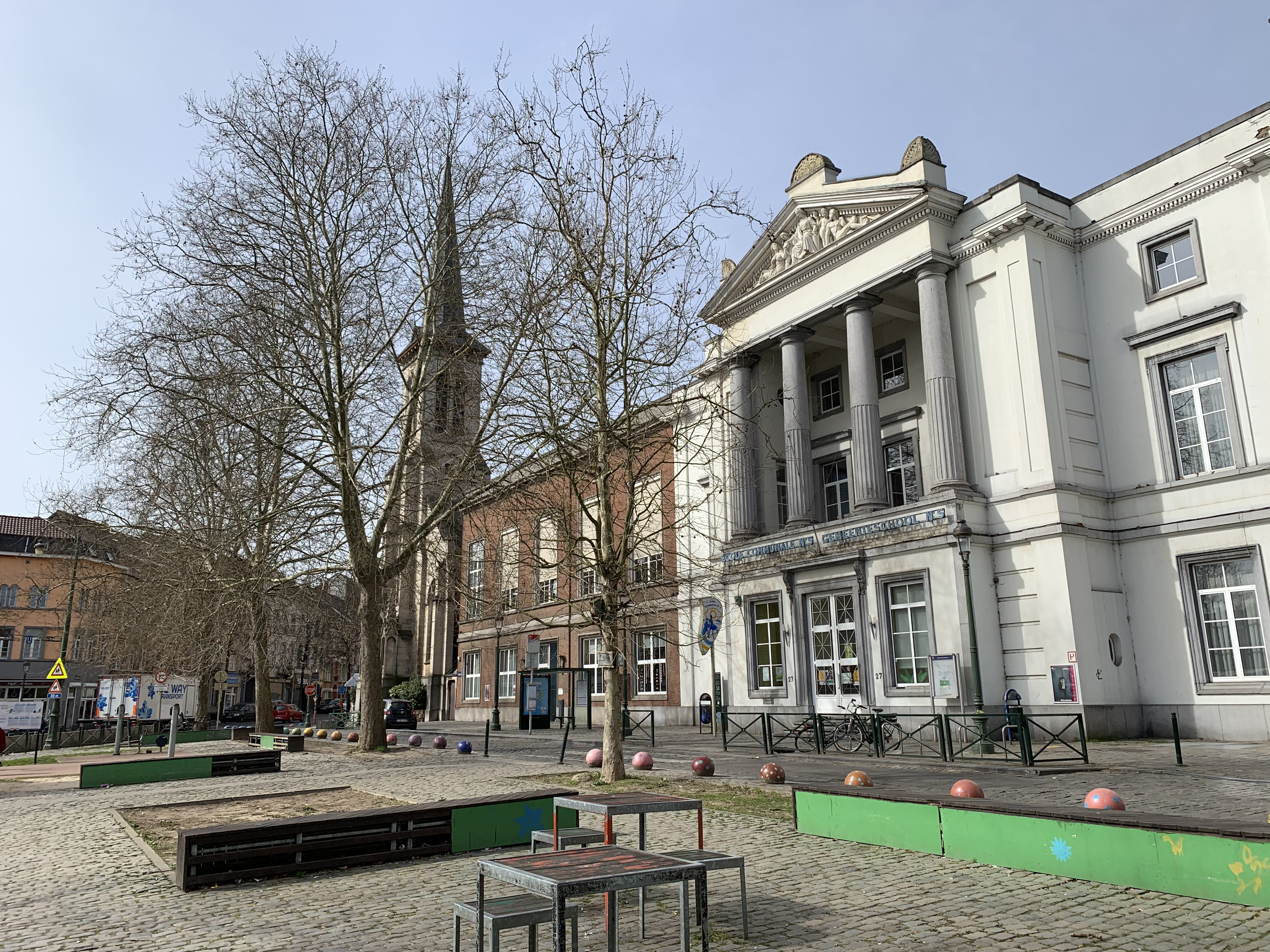
Place de la Duchesse de Brabant/Hertogin van Brabantplein

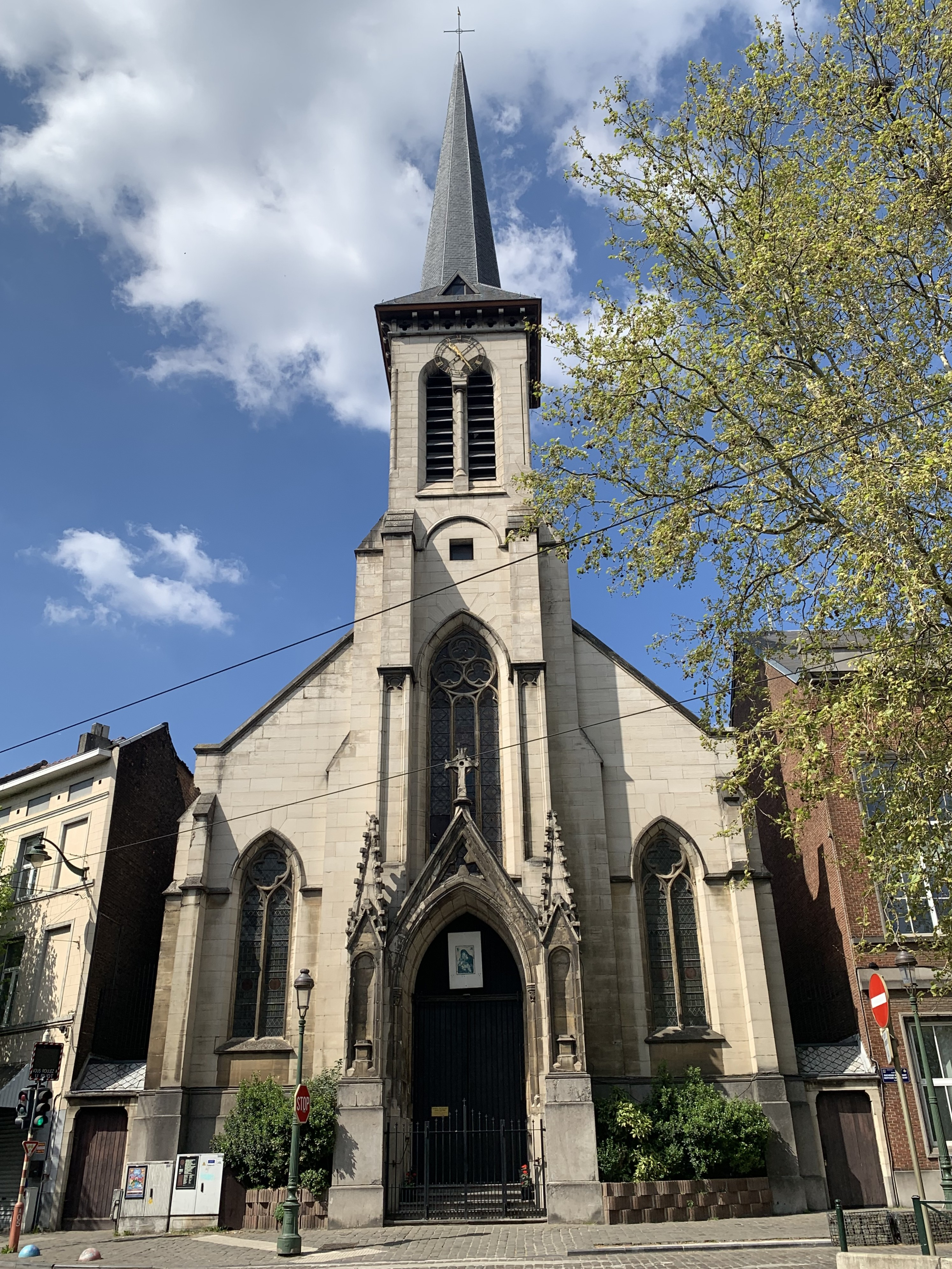
Church of St. Barbara

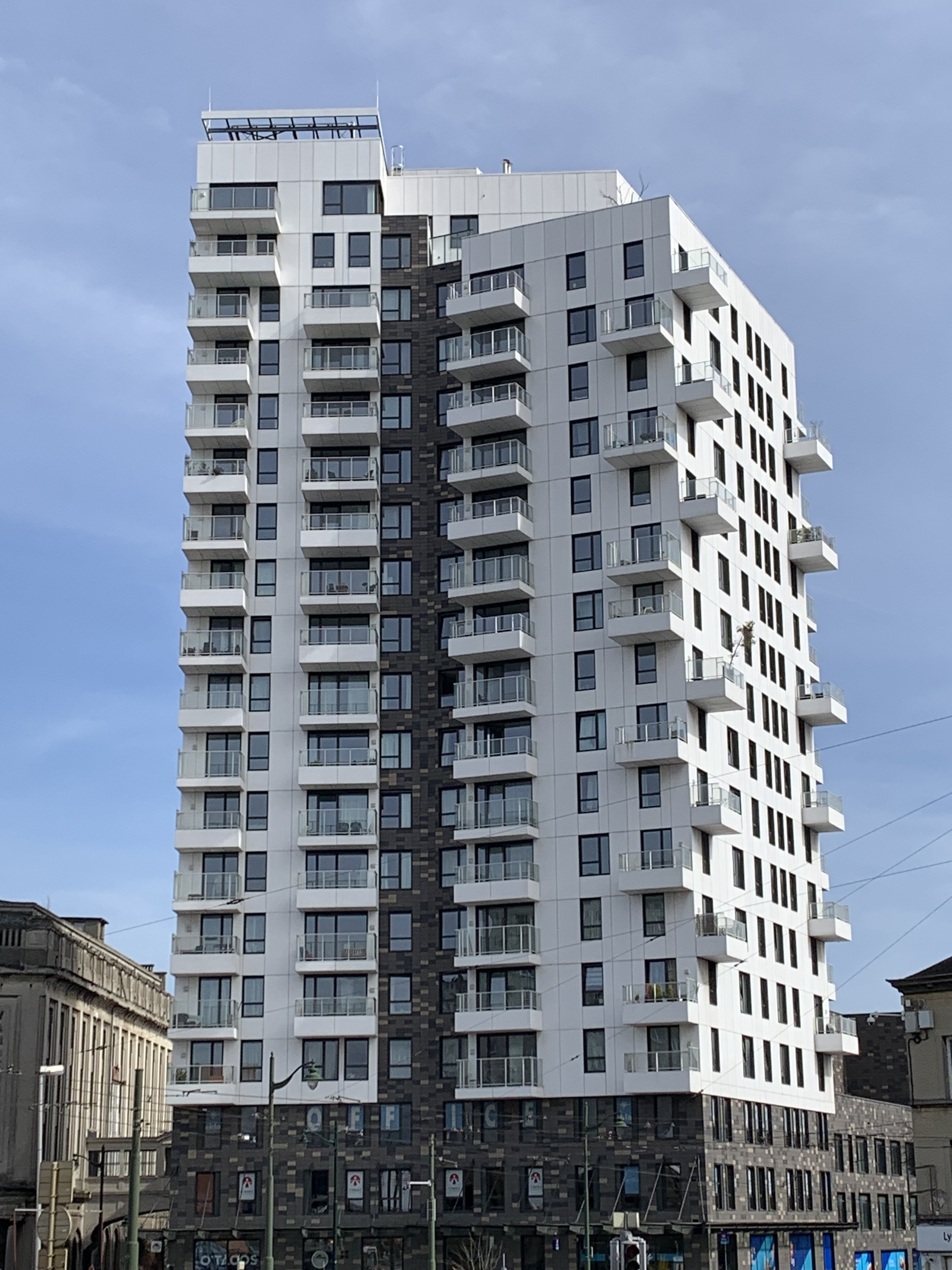
Ekla Tower

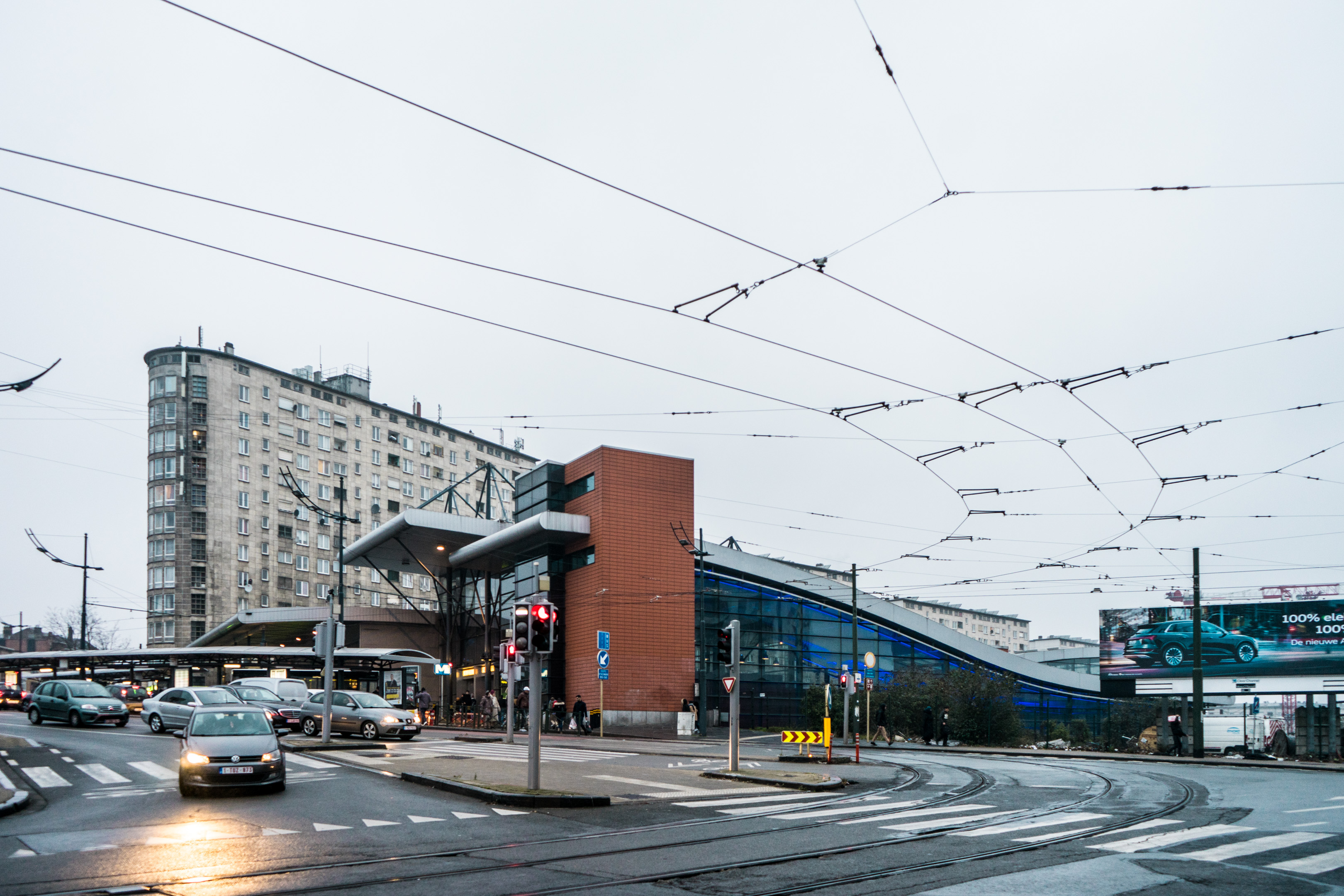
Brussels-West Station

==== Heyvaert ====
Located in the south-east of Molenbeek, near the Abattoirs of Anderlecht (the main slaughterhouse in Brussels) and along the Charleroi Canal, Heyvaert is part of the larger Cureghem district. It is bounded by the Rue Nicolas Doyen/Nicolas Doyenstraat, the Rue de Birmingham, the Place de la Duchesse de Brabant, the Rue Isidoor Teirlinck, the Rue Delaunoy/Delaunoystraat, and the Rue Heyvaert/Heyvaertstraat (formerly called the Rue de l'Écluse/Sasstraat because of its proximity to the canal lock; écluse meaning "lock" in French). The district, once primarily industrial, now offers an environment characterised by the used car trade, particularly exports to West Africa, as well as other related activities.

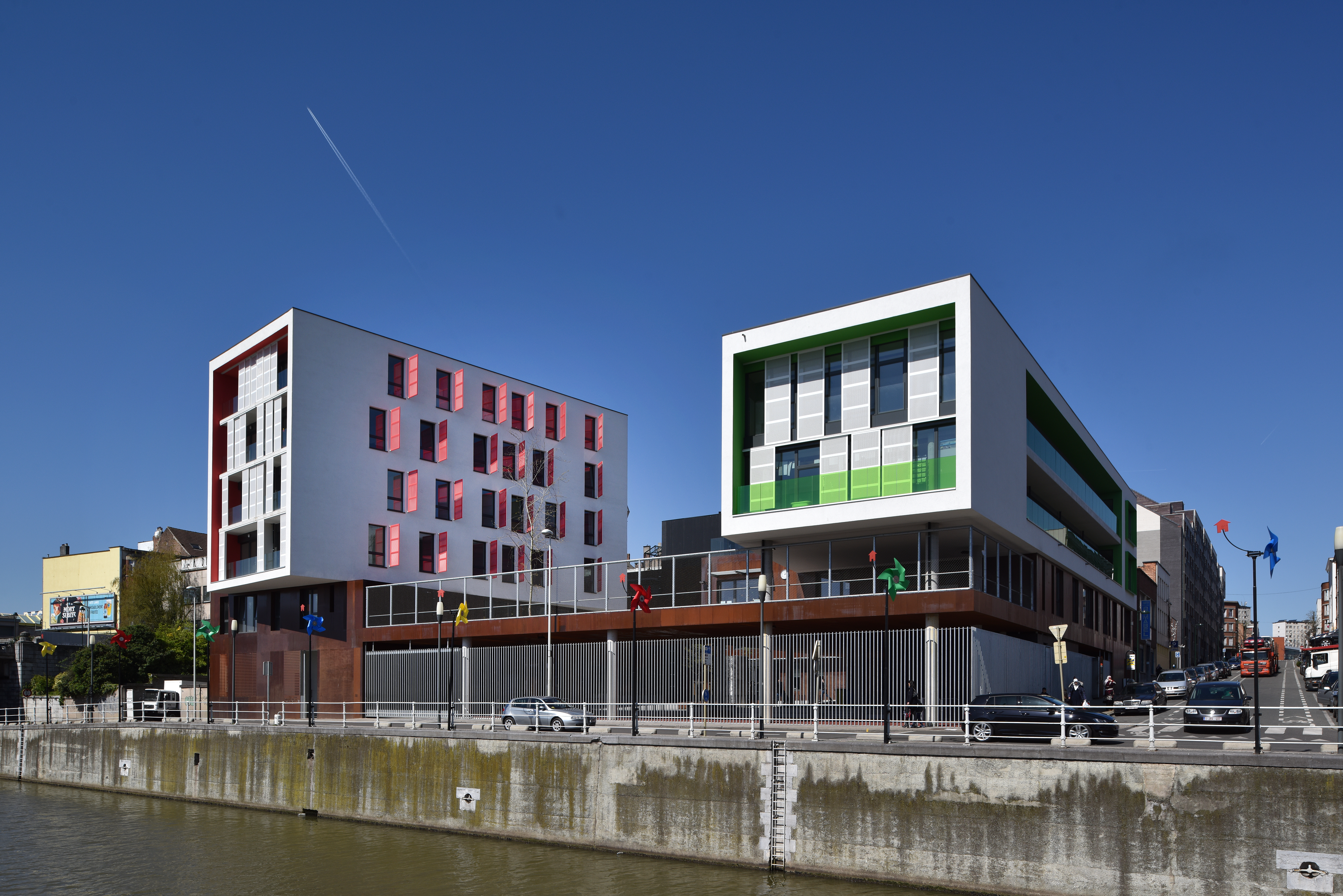
Bonne–Mariemont project on the Quai de Mariemont/Mariemontkaai

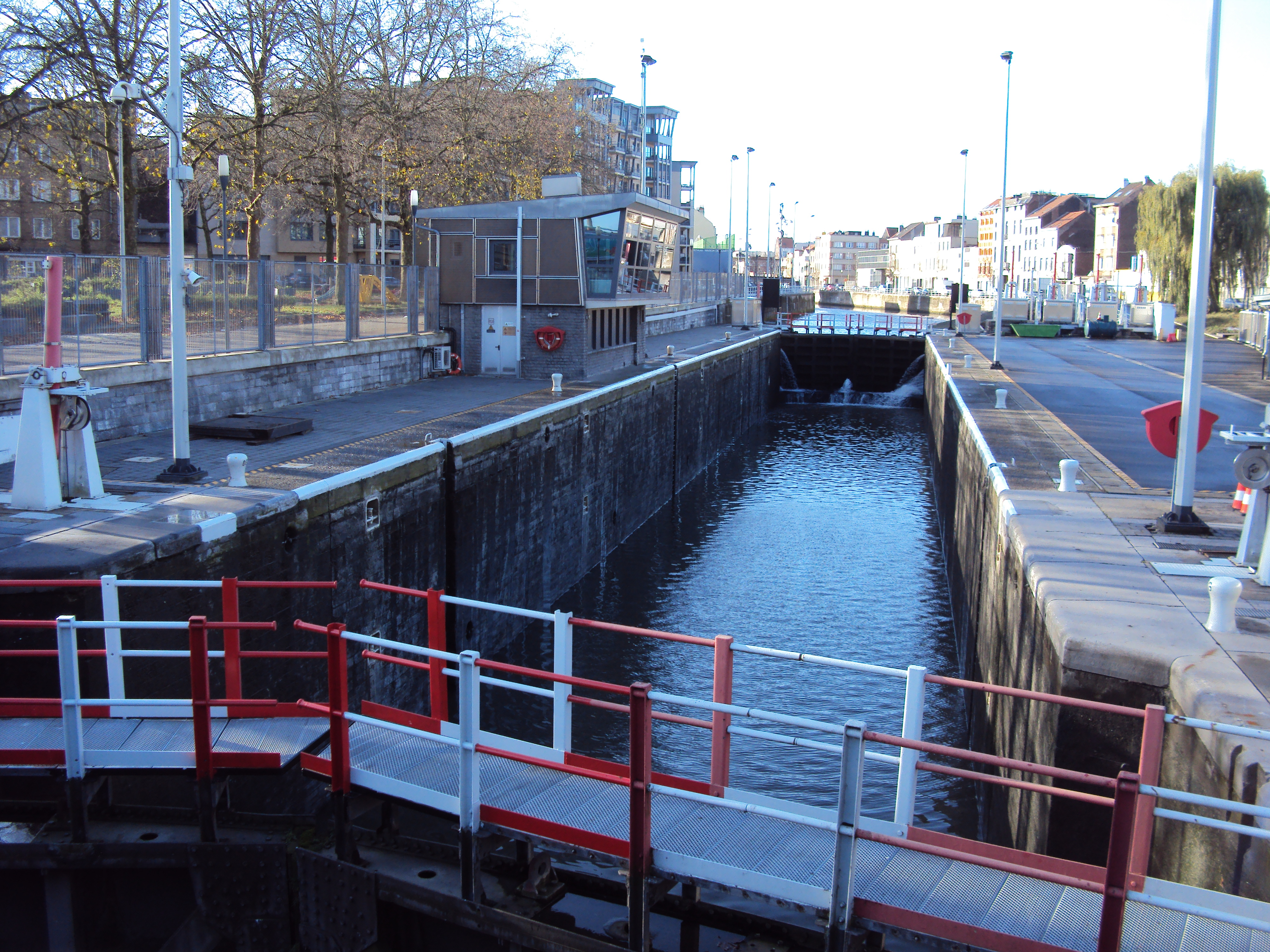
Molenbeek lock at the Ninove Gate

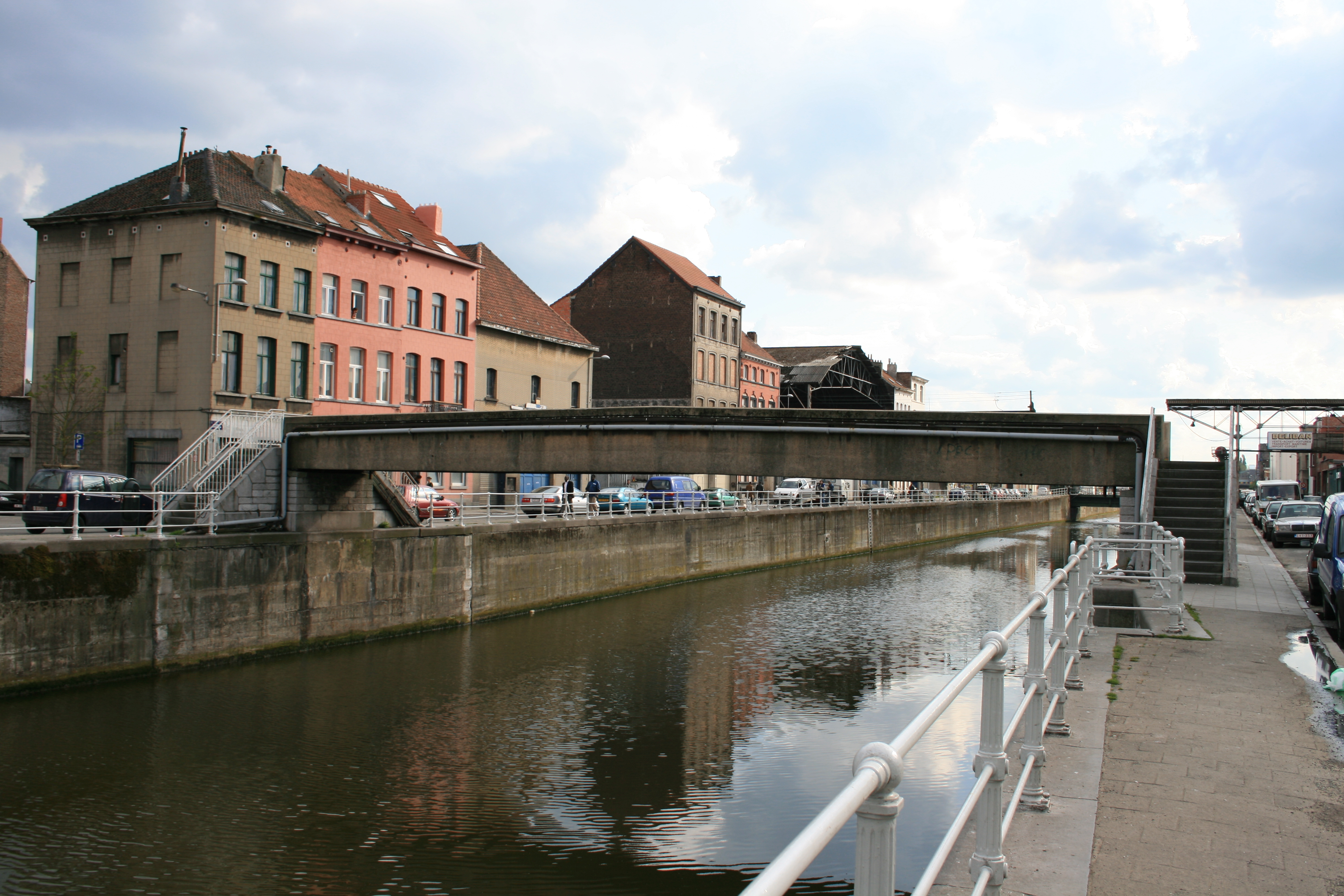
Guido Vanderhulst Footbridge

==== Maritime Quarter ====
Located in the north of Molenbeek, with a piece extending into the City of Brussels, the Maritime Quarter (French: Quartier Maritime, Dutch: Maritiemwijk) was born, around 1900, from the implementation of the Port of Brussels and the Maritime Station on the Tour & Taxis site. A number of customs agencies and handling activities mingled with homes were concentrated there and have given the neighbourhood a diverse character. The residents, historically made up of workers, as well as of the small and large bourgeoisie, were also from the outset of great diversity. In the interwar period, the Foyer Molenbeekois/Molenbeekse Haard housing cooperative built several large-scale social housing complexes for workers and employees in the district. Many traces of this history can still be found today, including old factories and workshops, as well as Art Deco and modernist apartment buildings, designed by architects such as Joseph Diongre, Armand de Saulnier and François Van Meulecom.

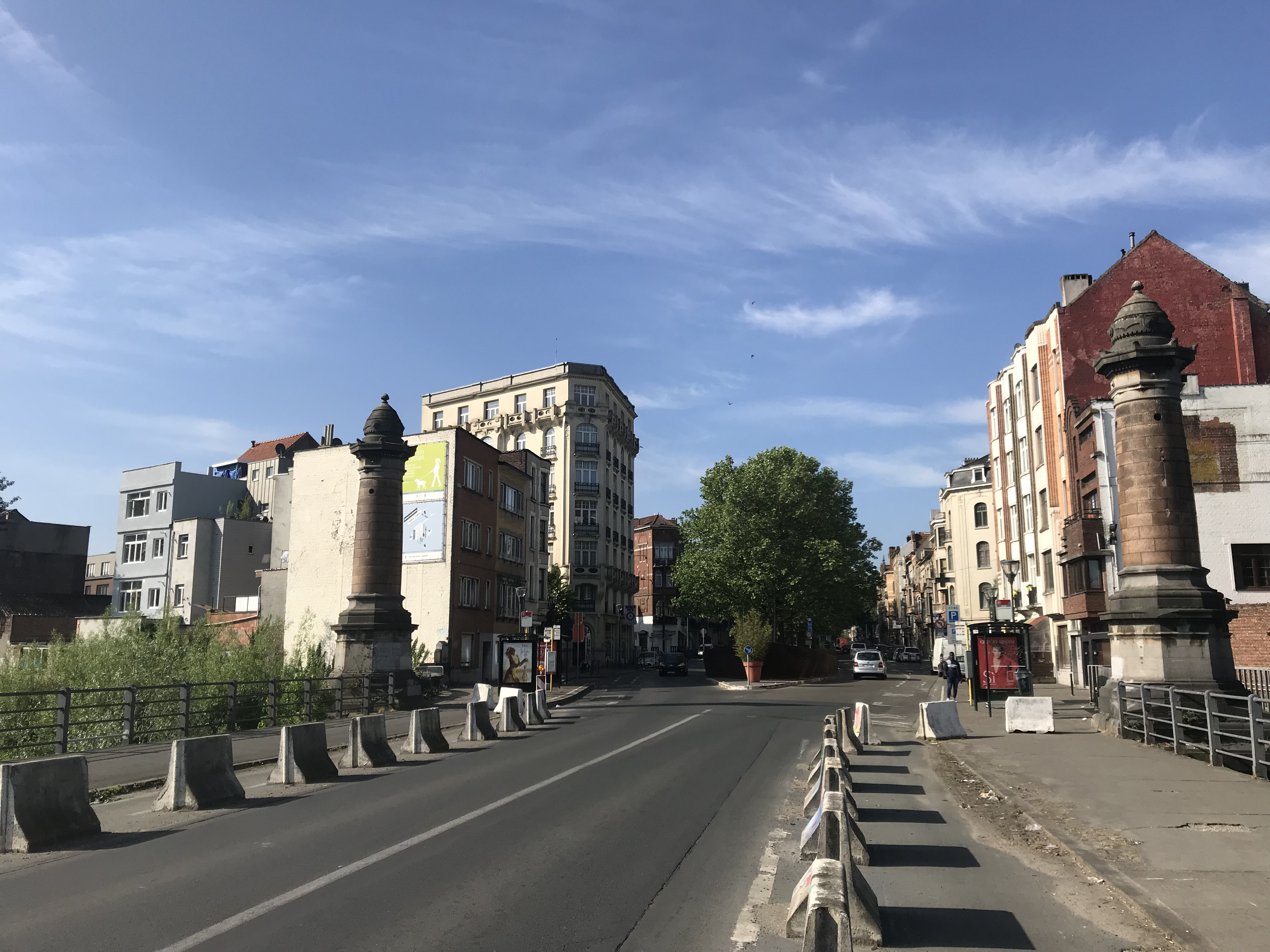
Jubilee Bridge on the Boulevard du Jubilé/Jubelfeestlaan

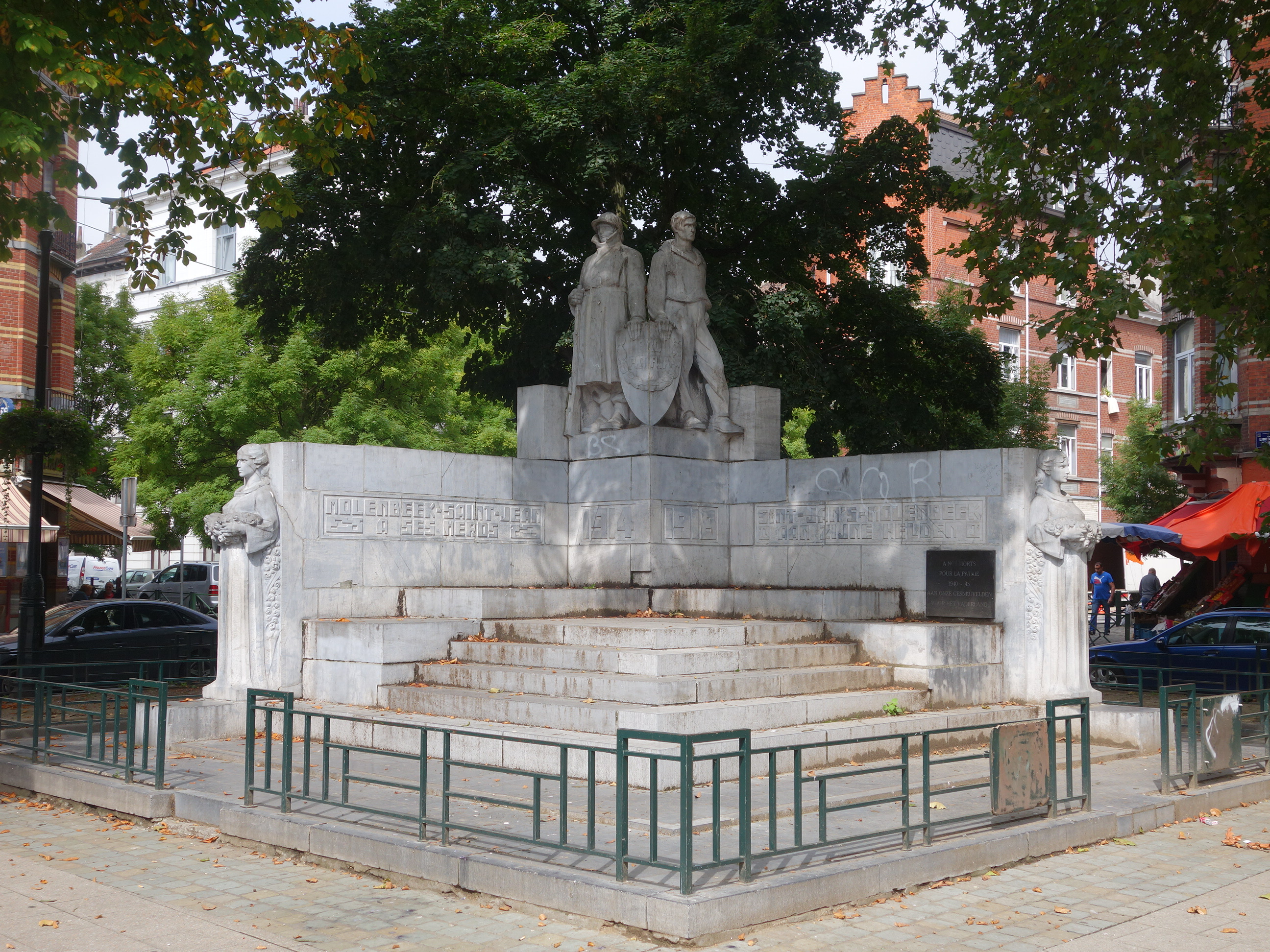
World War I memorial on the Square des Libérateurs/Bevrijderssquare

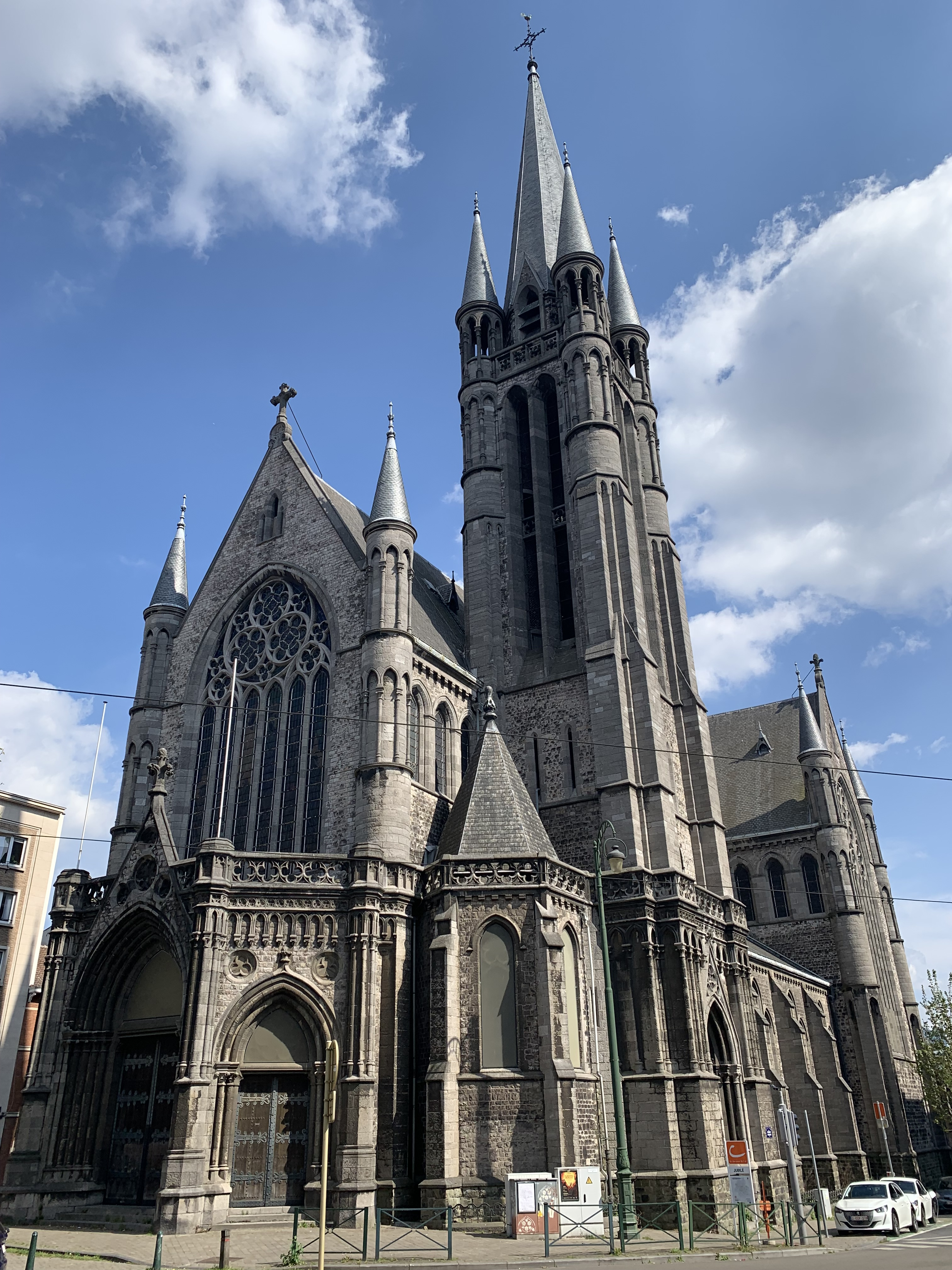
Church of St. Remigius

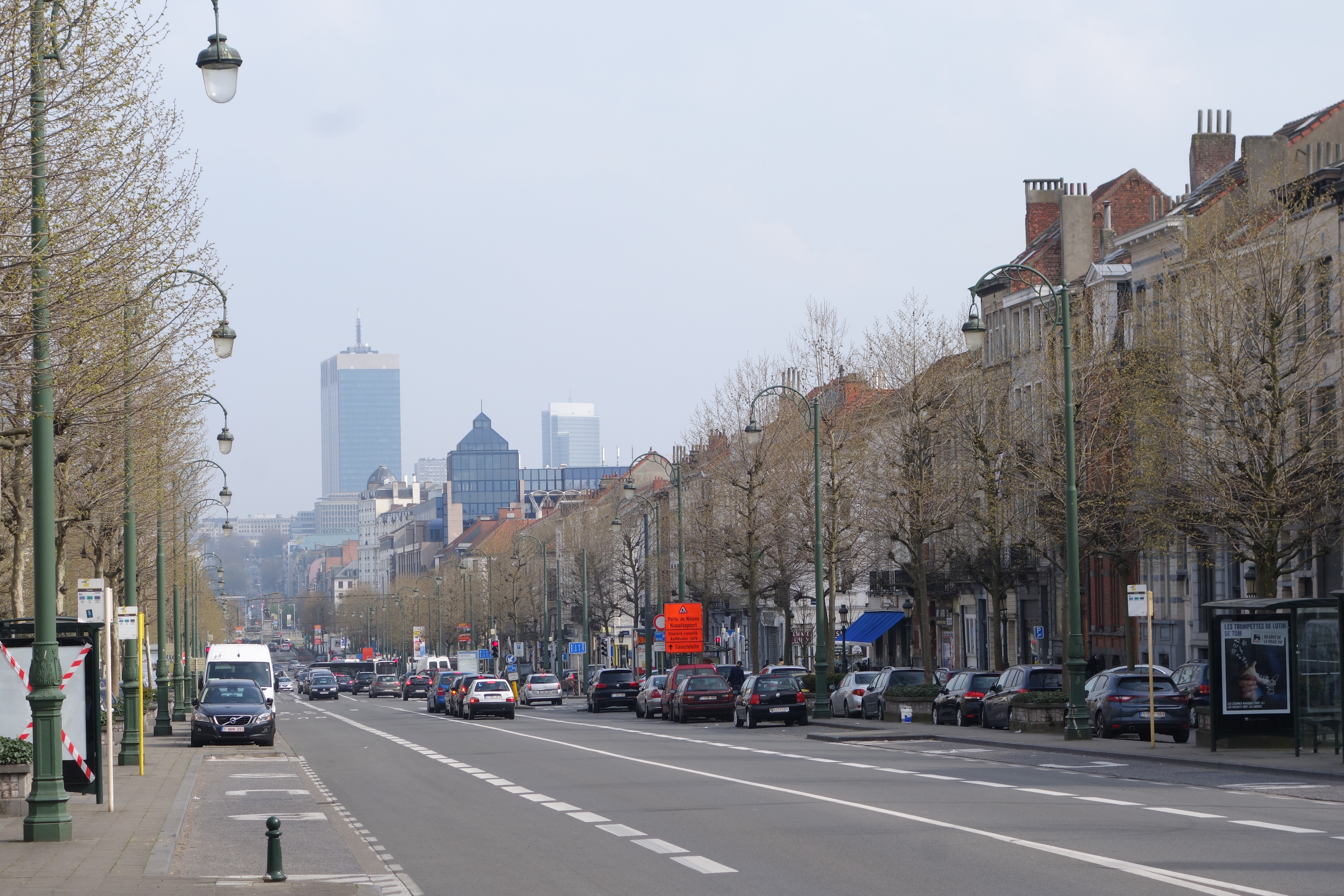
Boulevard Léopold II/Leopold II-laan

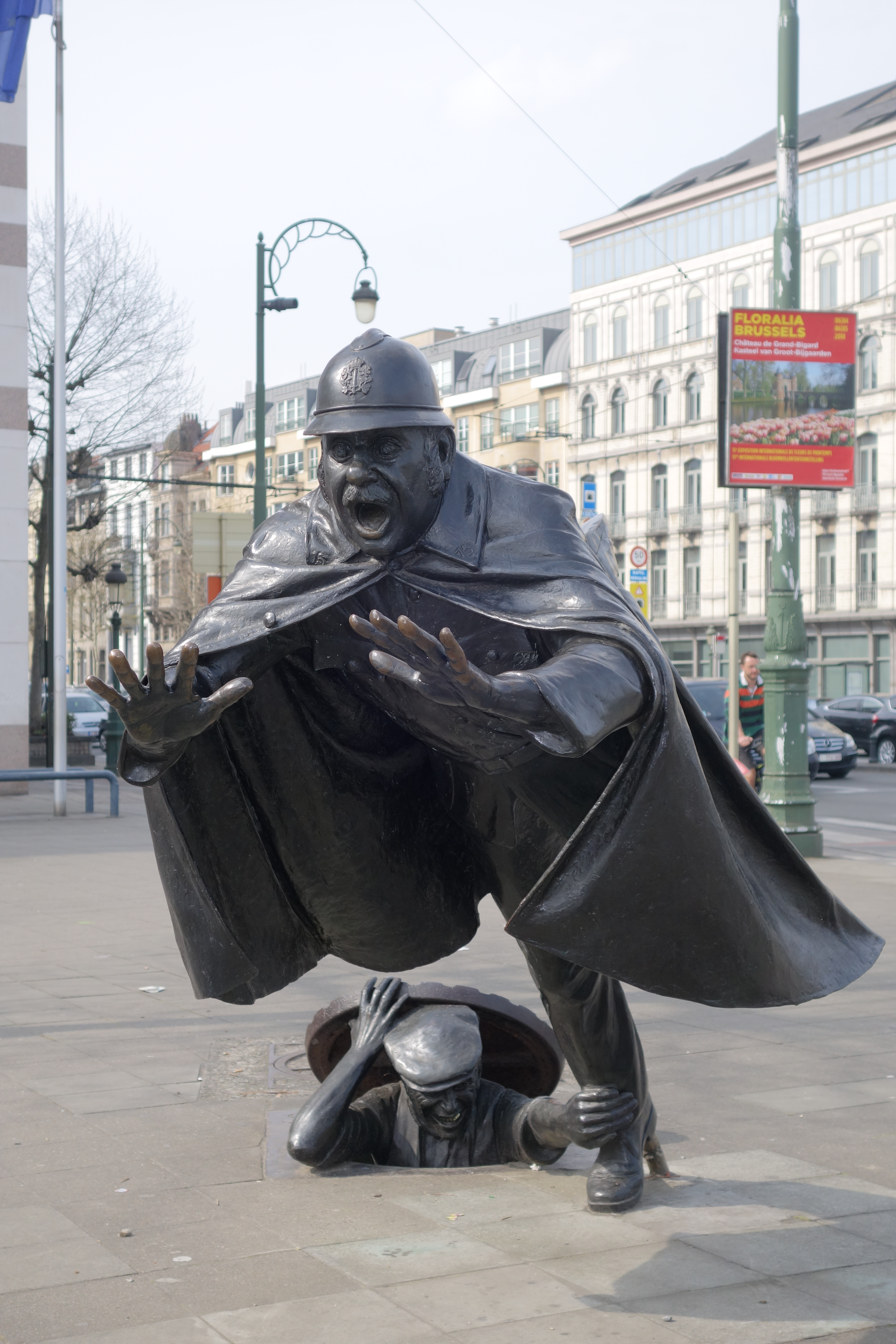
Place Sainctelette/Sainctelettesquare (Vaartkapoen)

==== Karreveld ====
Located in the north of the upper part of Molenbeek, Karreveld Park and its surrounding district are named after the former domain of Karreveld Castle, which now covers 3 ha (7.4 acres). The name Karreveld derives from the Old Dutch Karreelvelt, meaning "field of brick earth", referring to the local brickmaking activity that continued into the early 20th century. In 1912, Karreveld became one of the sites associated with the early development of Belgian cinema. At the request of Charles Pathé (Pathé Cinémas), the French director Alfred Machin established the country's first film studio there. Today, it is a mostly residential neighbourhood between the Avenue de la Liberté/Vrijheidslaan, the Chaussée de Gand and the railroad.

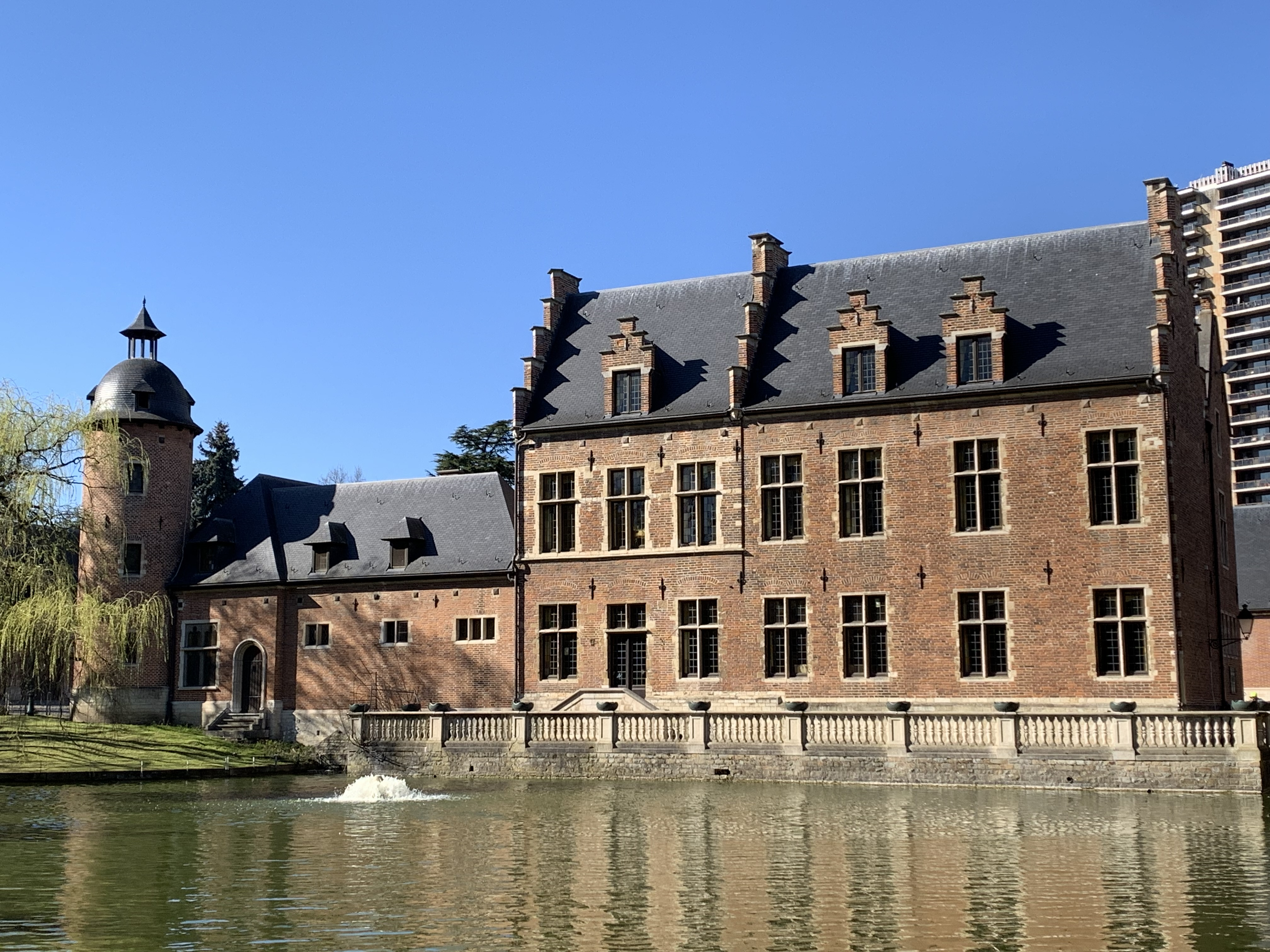
Karreveld Castle

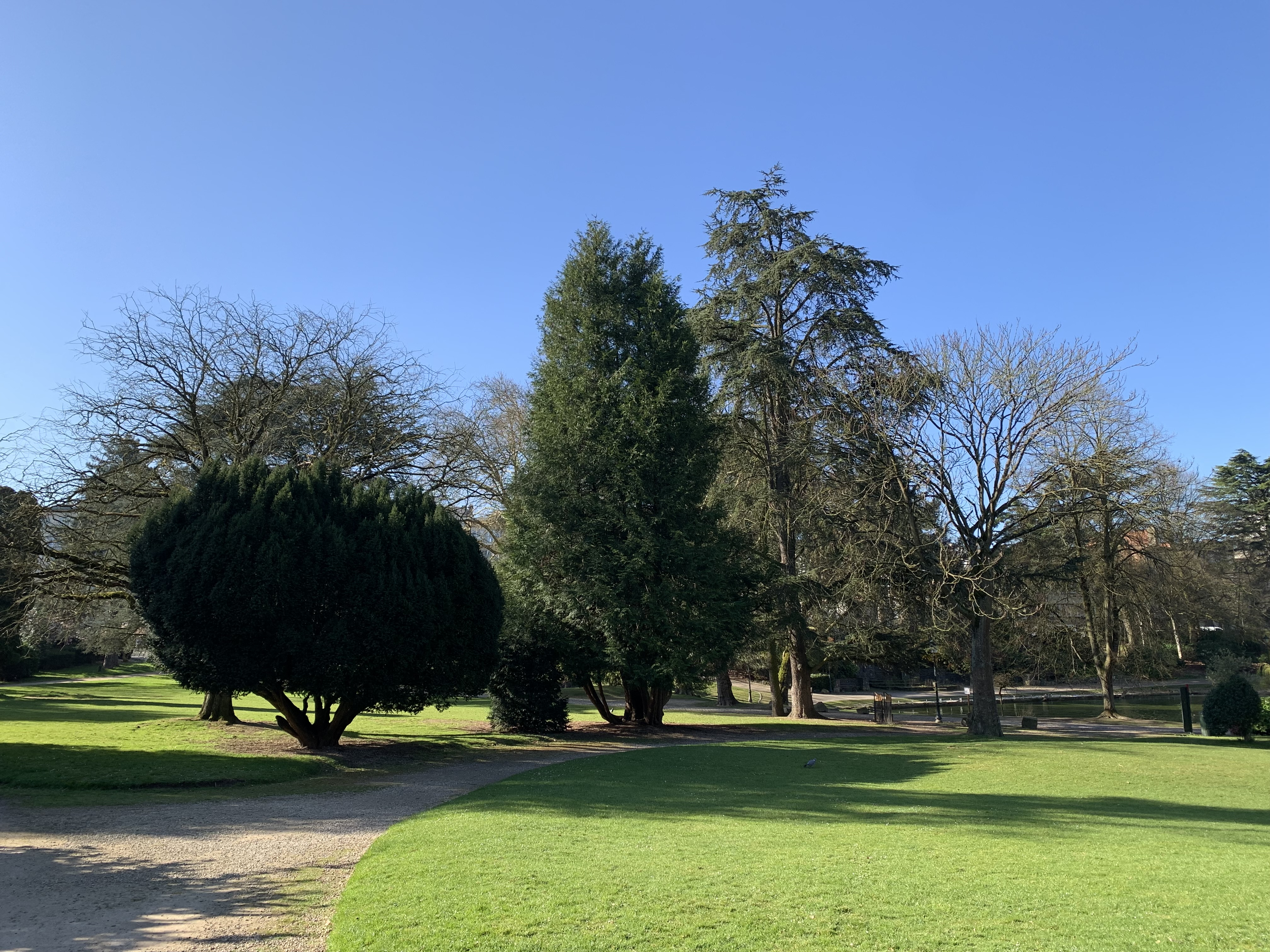
Karreveld Park

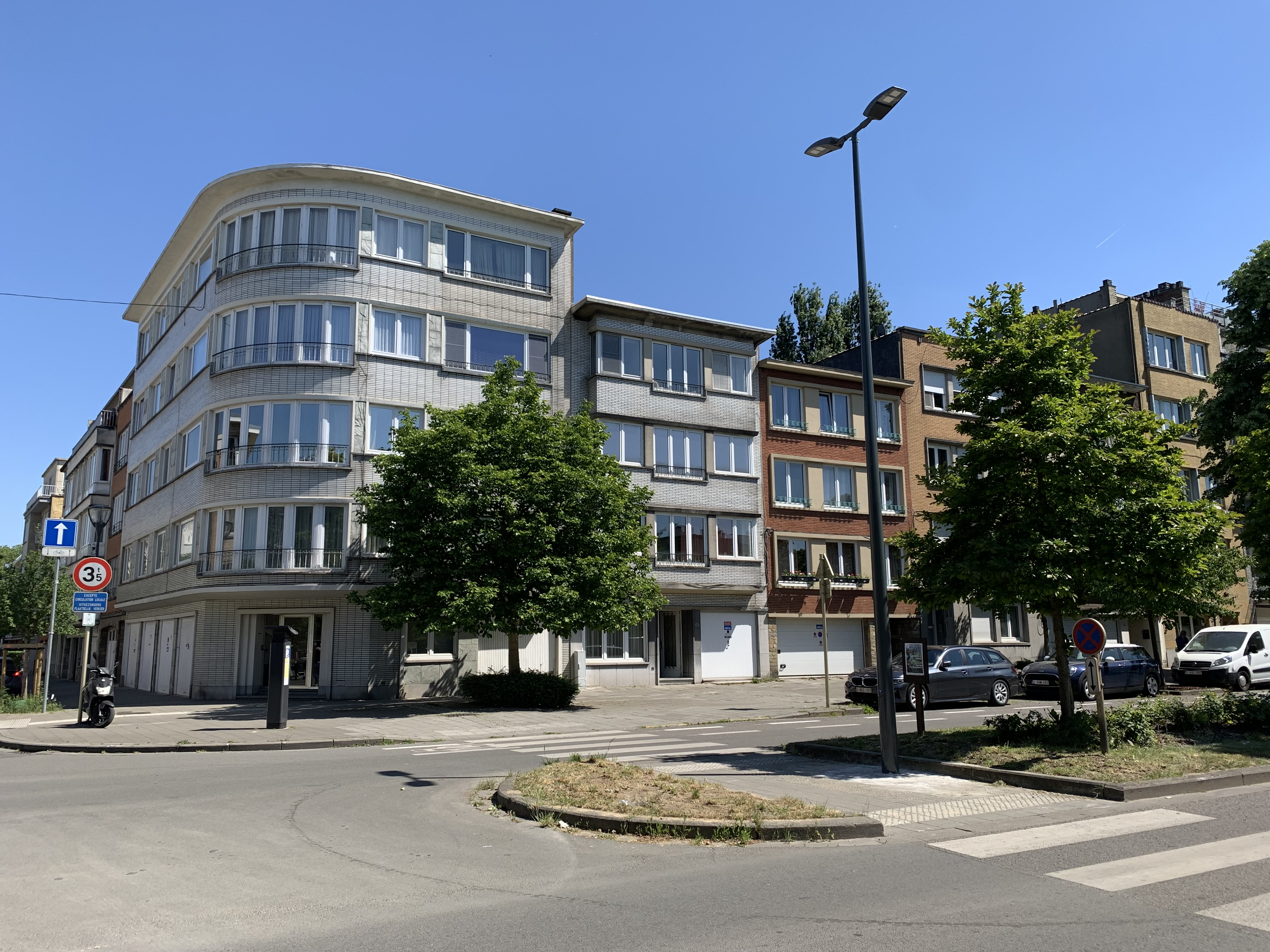
Avenue du Karreveld/Karreveldlaan

==== Korenbeek ====
Located in the north-east of Molenbeek, Korenbeek takes its name from a former stream that originated near the present-day Rue du Korenbeek/Korenbeekstraat and once fed the ponds of Karreveld Castle. The largely residential neighbourhood is characterised by mid-sized housing and a historically mixed working-class population. It is notably home to Molenbeek Cemetery between the Chaussée de Gand and the Boulevard Louis Mettewie/Louis Mettewielaan. This cemetery was inaugurated in 1864 to replace the old parish cemetery around the Church of St. John the Baptist, which had become too small, and whose last remains were cleared in 1932.

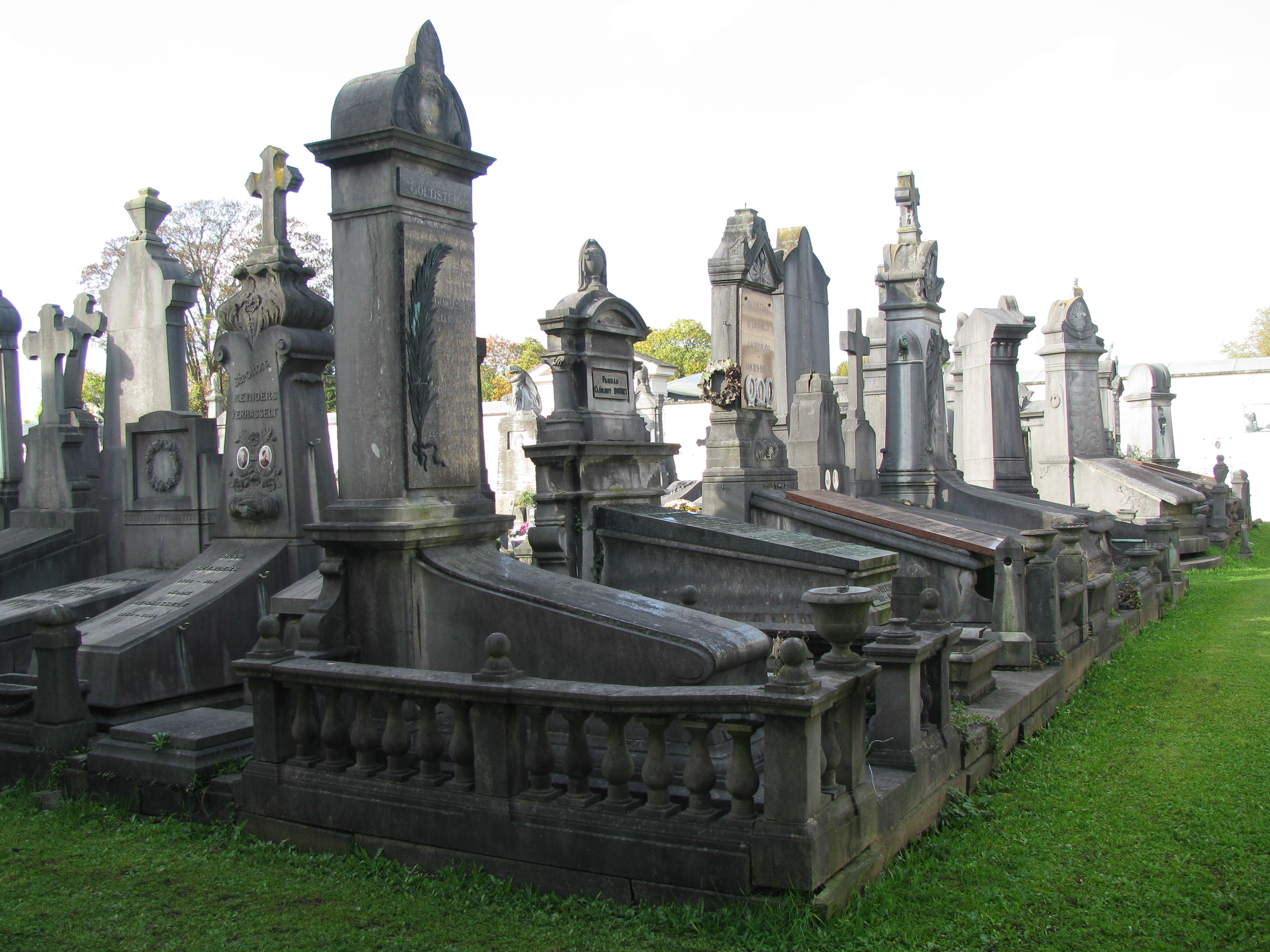
Molenbeek-Saint-Jean Cemetery

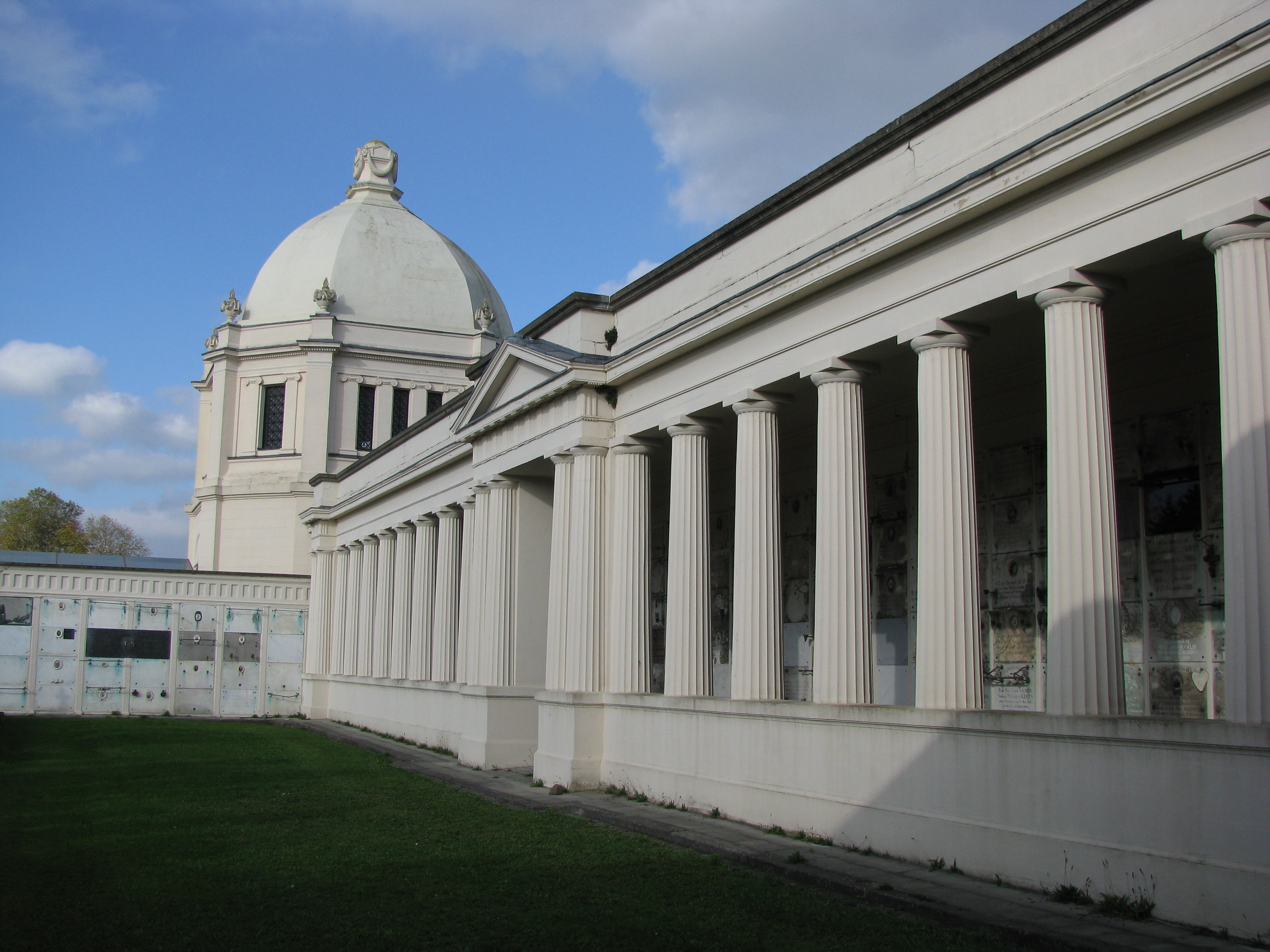
Columbarium of Molenbeek Cemetery

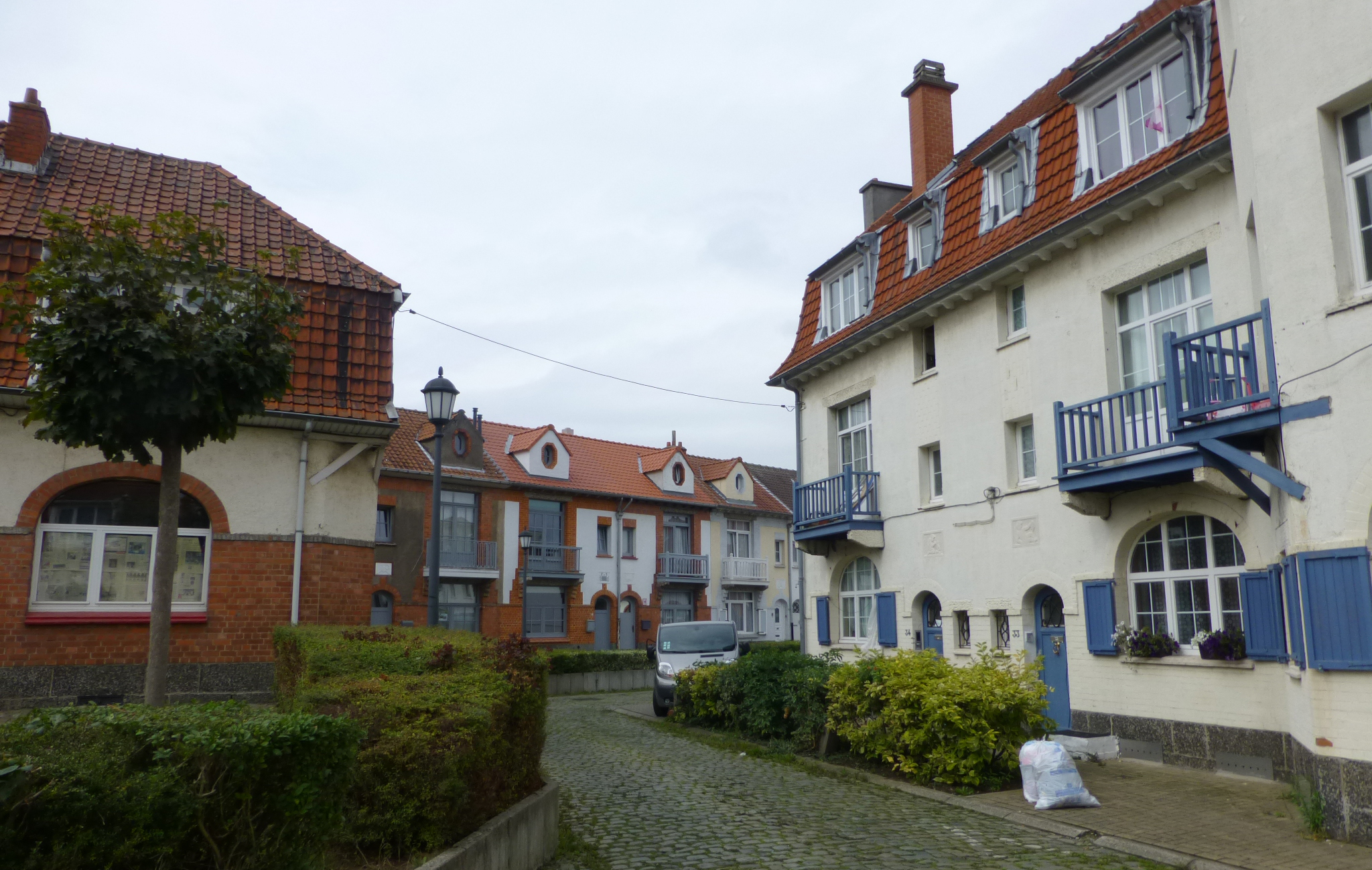
Diongre garden city

==== Machtens (Marie-José) ====
Located in the upper part of Molenbeek, this district lies in the valley of the Maalbeek (or Molenbeek) that gave the municipality its name. Originally, the area was part of the former Oostendaal estate. In 1920, it was purchased by the municipality and partly turned into two parks, Albert Park and Marie-José Park, in the triangle formed by the Boulevard Edmond Machtens/Edmond Machtenslaan, the Avenue De Roovere/De Rooverelaan and the Boulevard Joseph Baeck/Joseph Baecklaan. They were designed by the architect and urban planner Louis Van der Swaelmen, and are named after King Albert I and his daughter, Princess Marie-José, the last Queen of Italy.

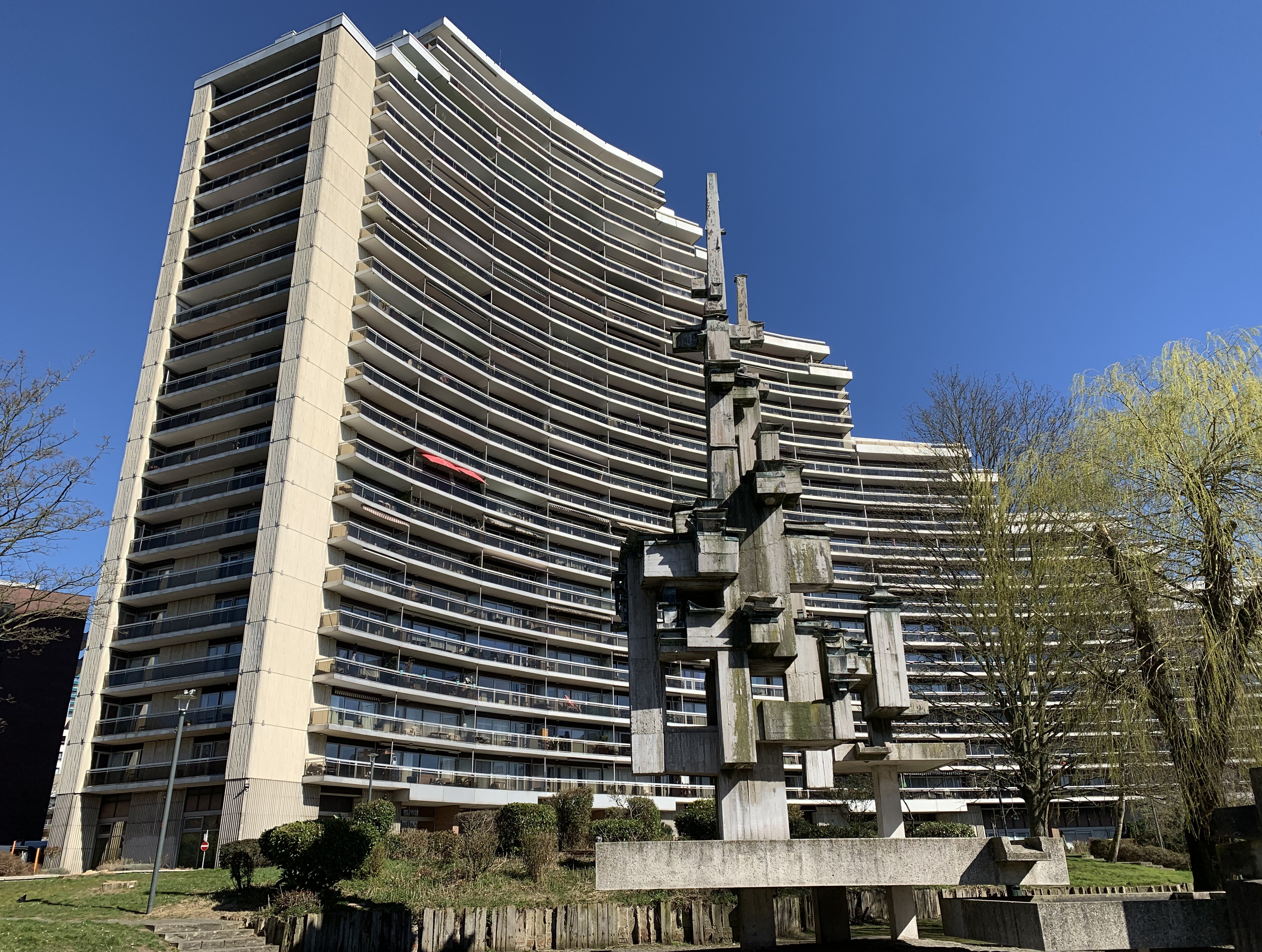
Boulevard Edmond Machtens/Edmond Machtenslaan

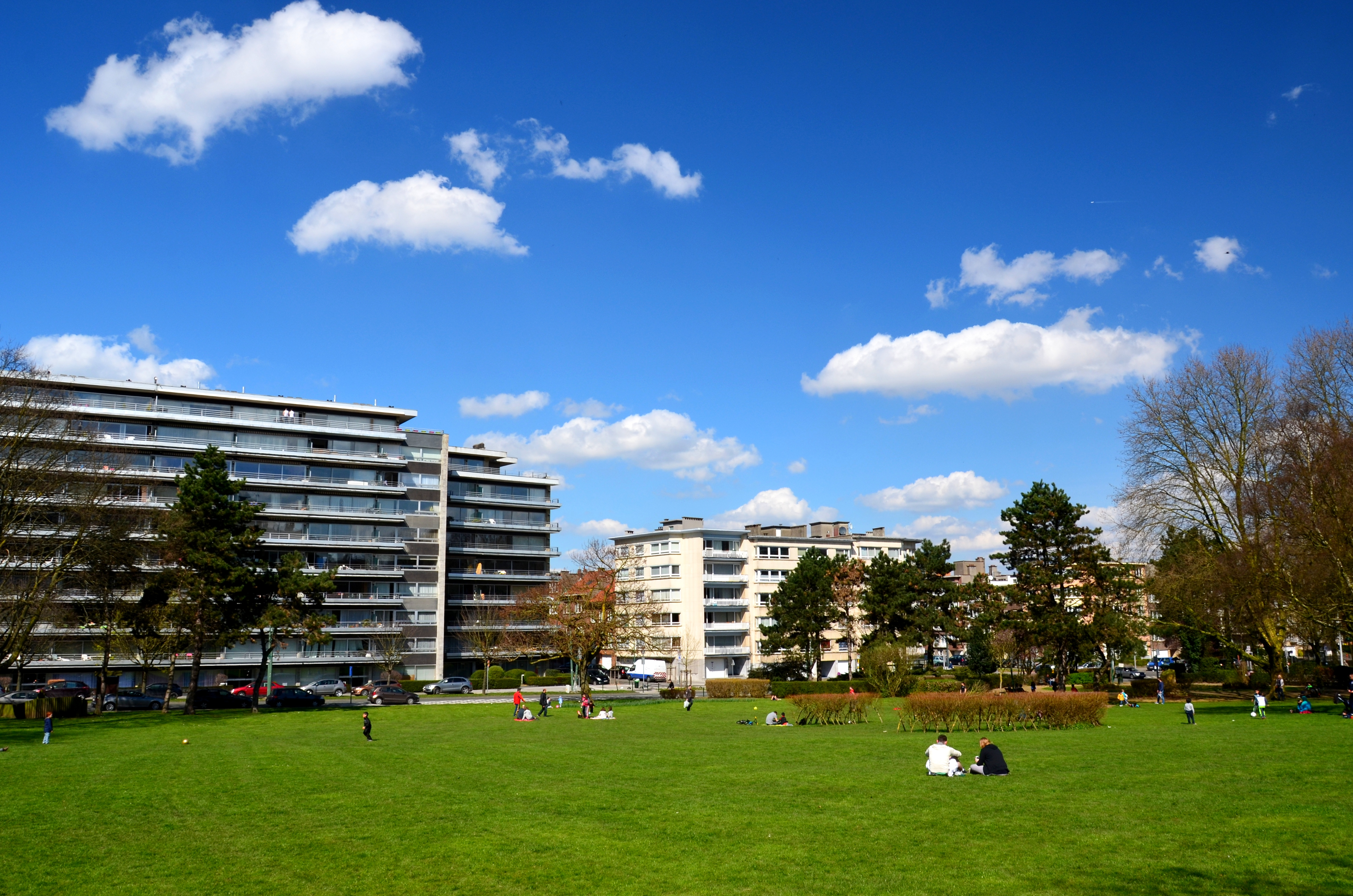
Albert Park

==== Osseghem/Ossegem ====
Osseghem/Ossegem is centrally located in the upper part of Molenbeek, west of the municipality's historical centre. The neighbourhood used to be a rural hamlet. The name is of Germanic (Frankish) origin and is composed of Odso + -inga + heim, meaning "residence/domain of the family of Odso". An old country road, today's Rue d'Osseghem/Ossegemstraat, which led to the Chaussée de Gand near the current Osseghem/Ossegem metro station, connected the hamlet to Molenbeek and Brussels.

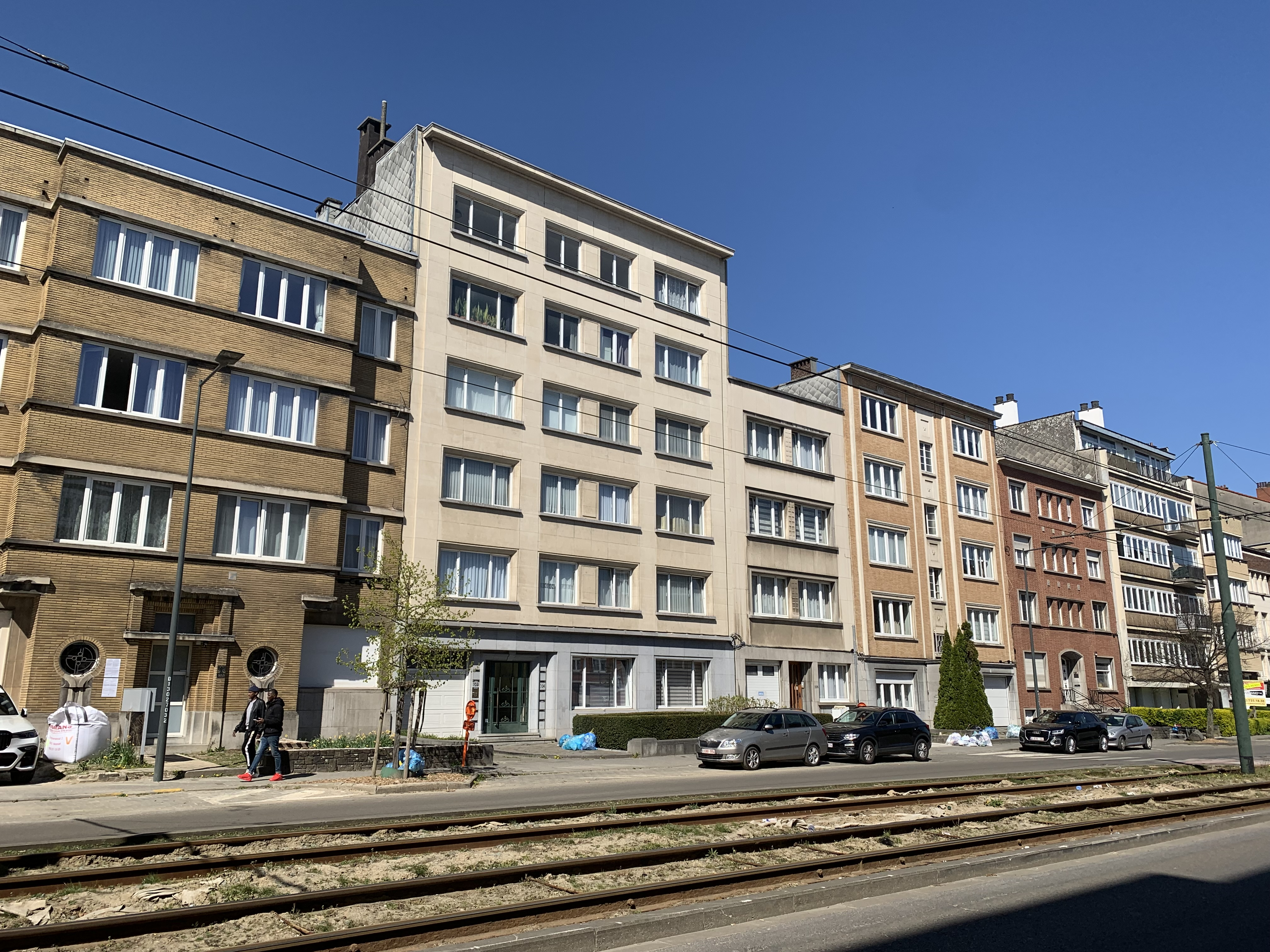
Avenue Brigade Piron/Brigade Pironlaan

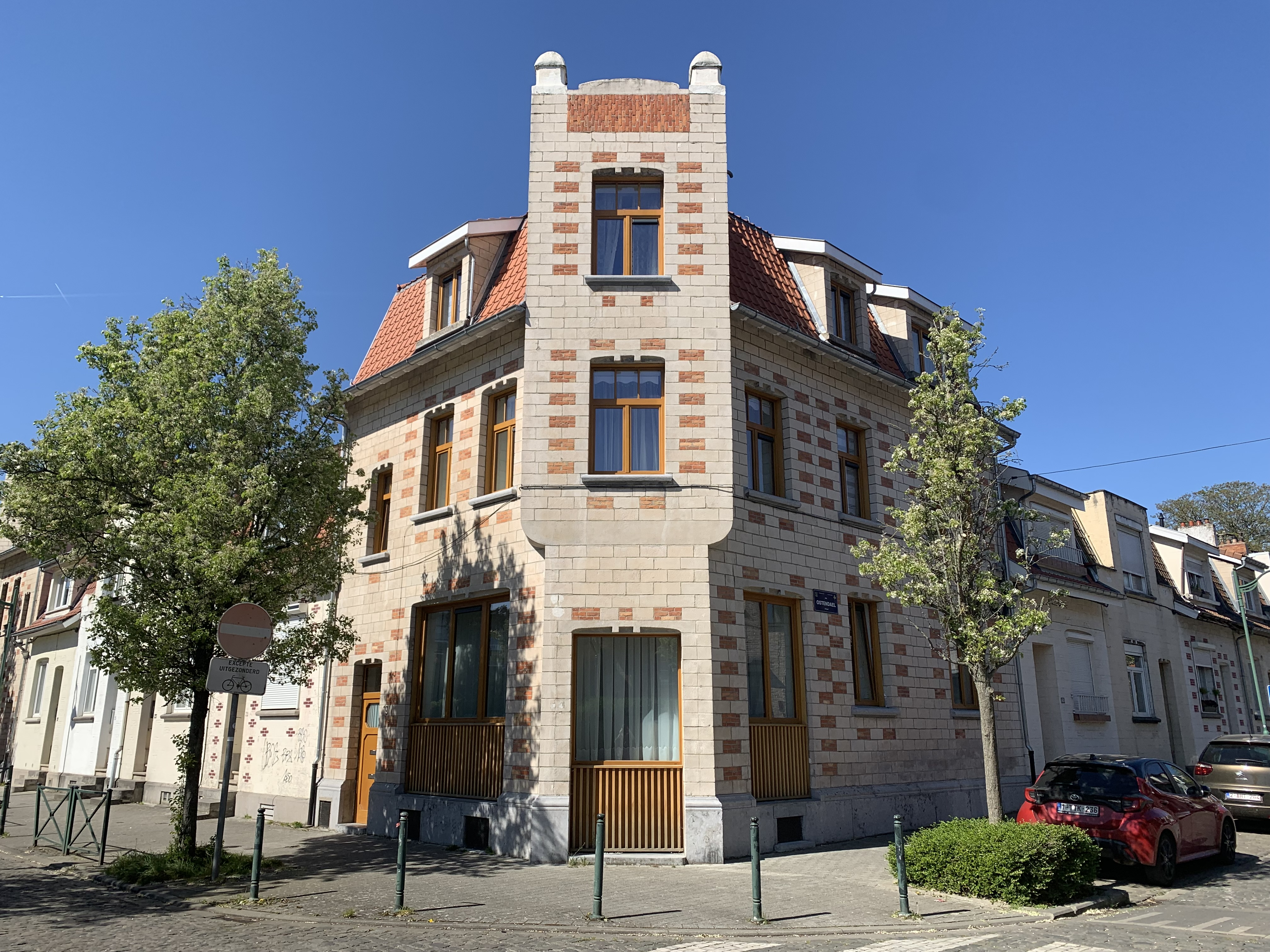
Gulden Bodem garden city

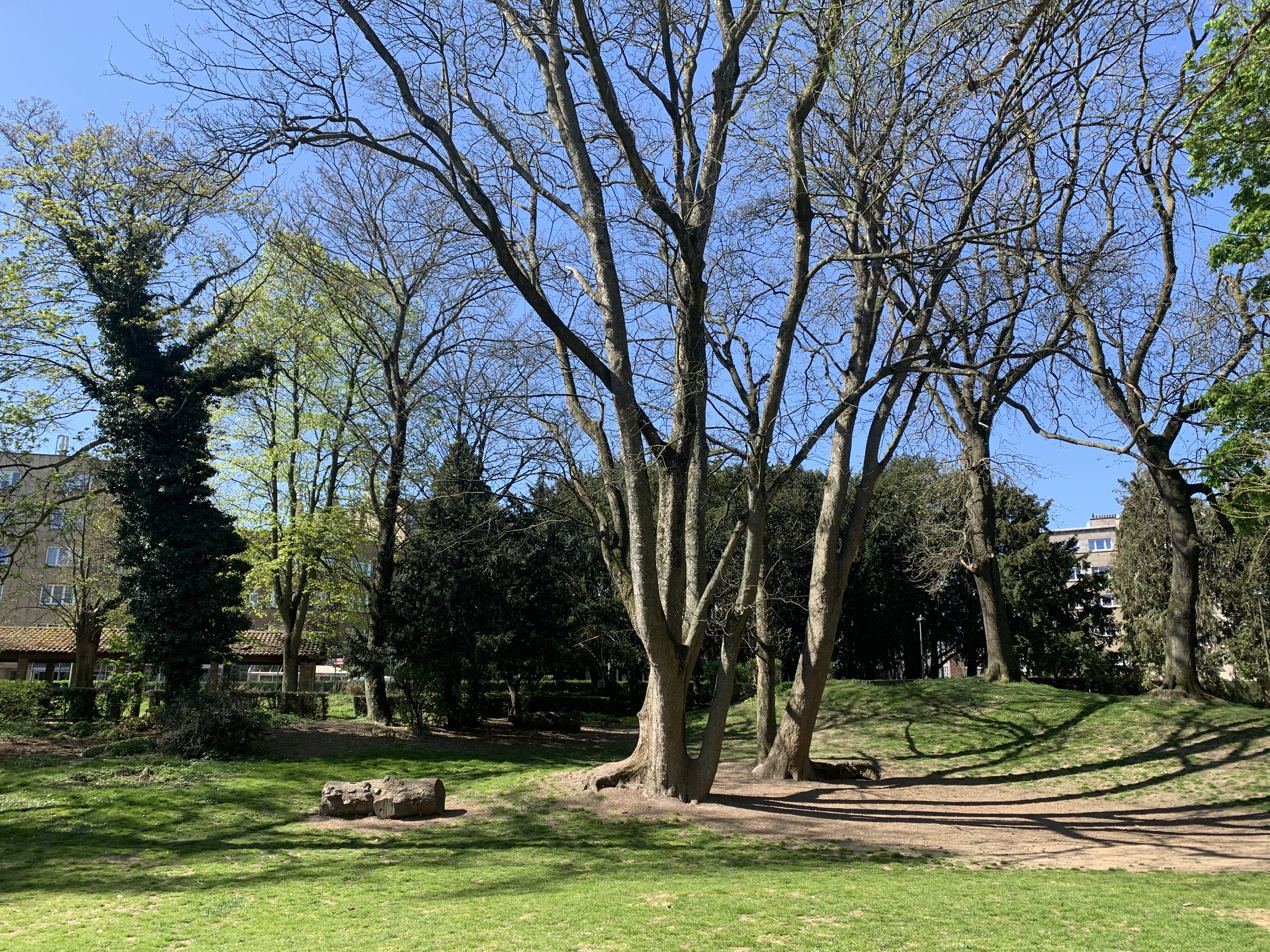
Muses Park

==== Scheutbos (Mettewie) ====
Located in the extreme west of Molenbeek, near the Boulevard Louis Mettewie, the Scheutbos (or Scheutbosch) is the municipality's remaining green area, home to the likewise named semi-natural site of the Scheutbos. It is a predominantly residential neighbourhood, characterised by broad avenues and large post-war housing complexes interspersed with extensive green spaces.

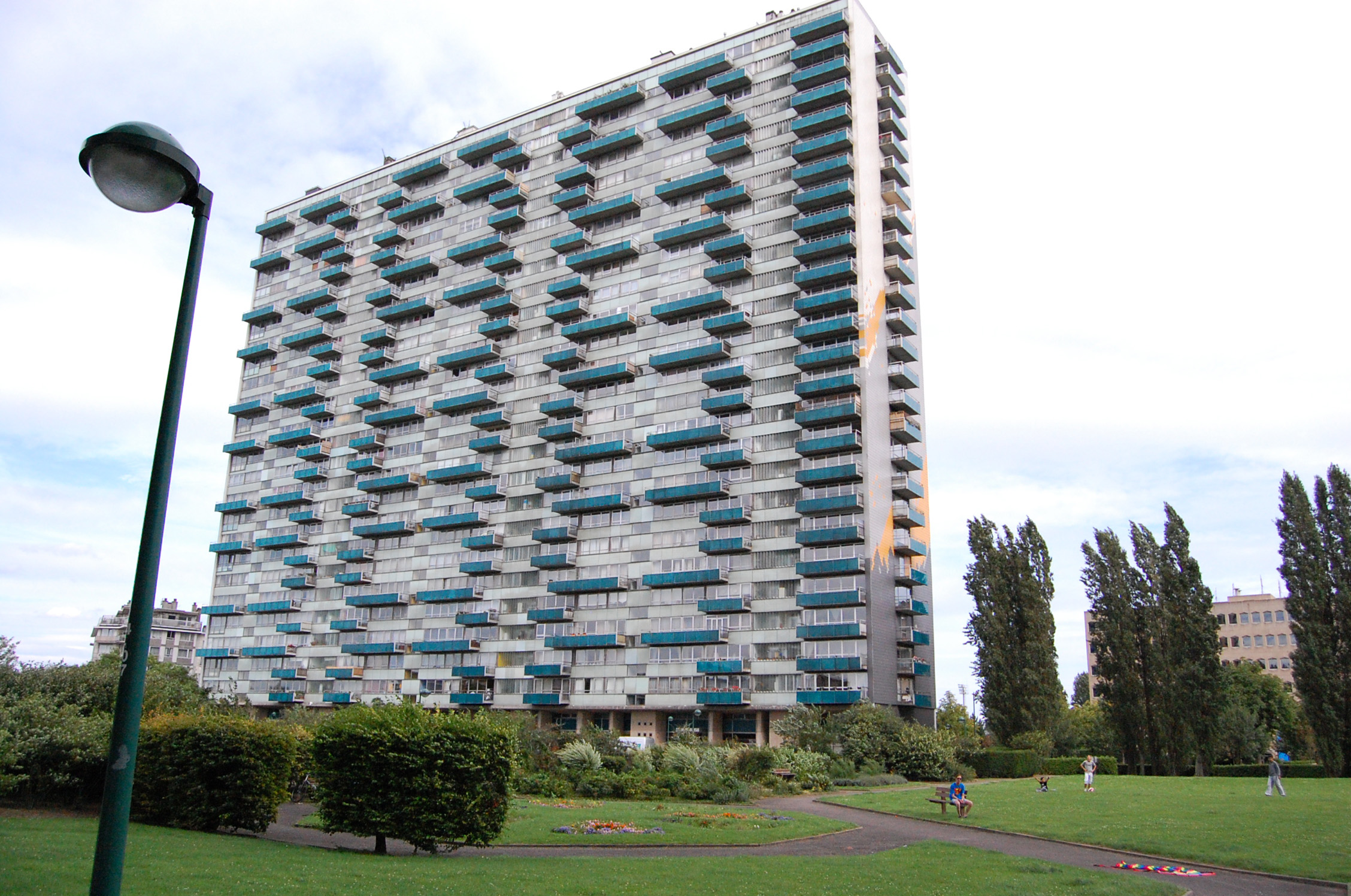
L'Écluse Tower on the Boulevard Louis Mettewie/Louis Mettewielaan

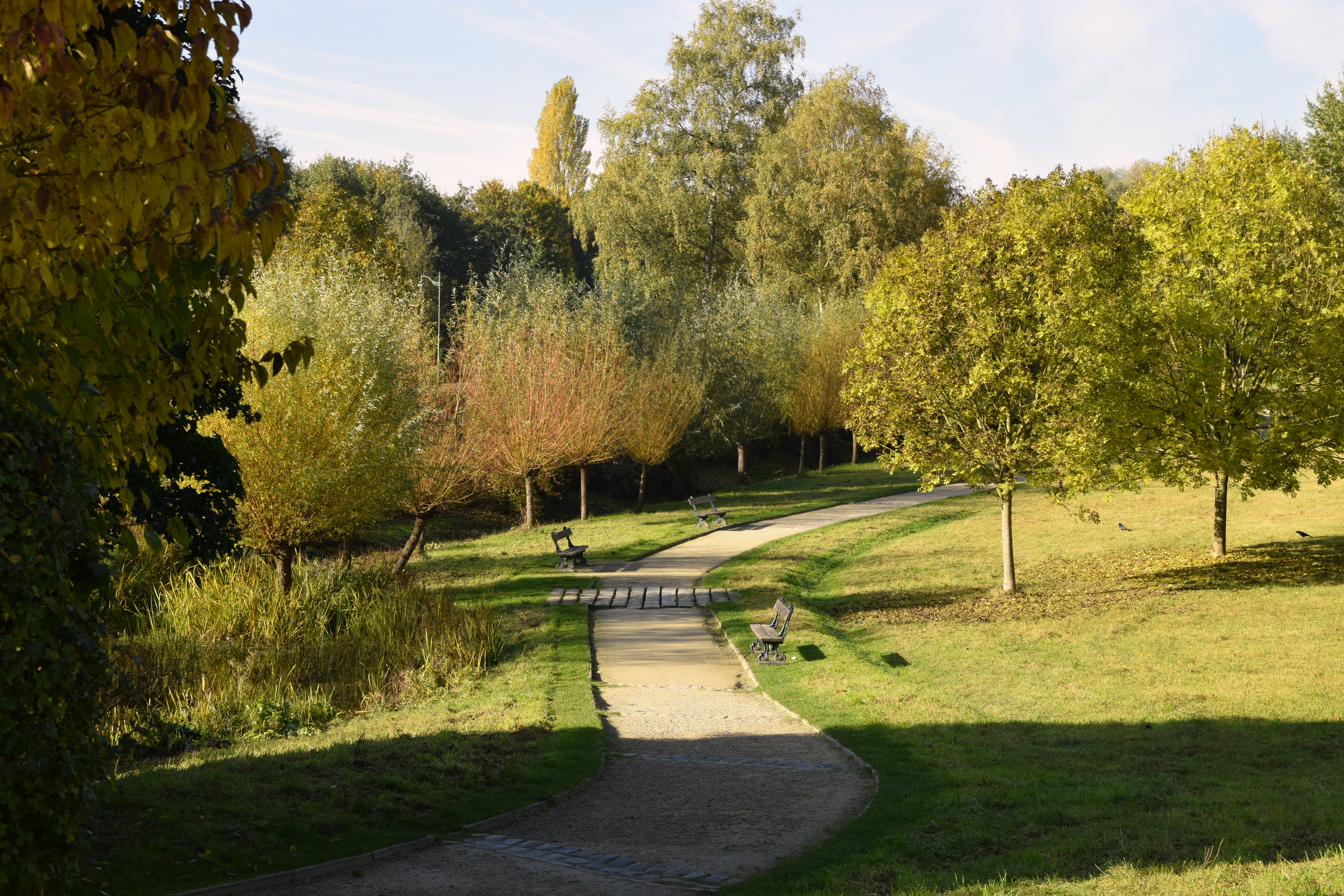
Scheutbos

=== Saint-Gilles/Sint-Gillis ===
==== Historical centre ====
The historical centre of Saint-Gilles is the municipality's central district.

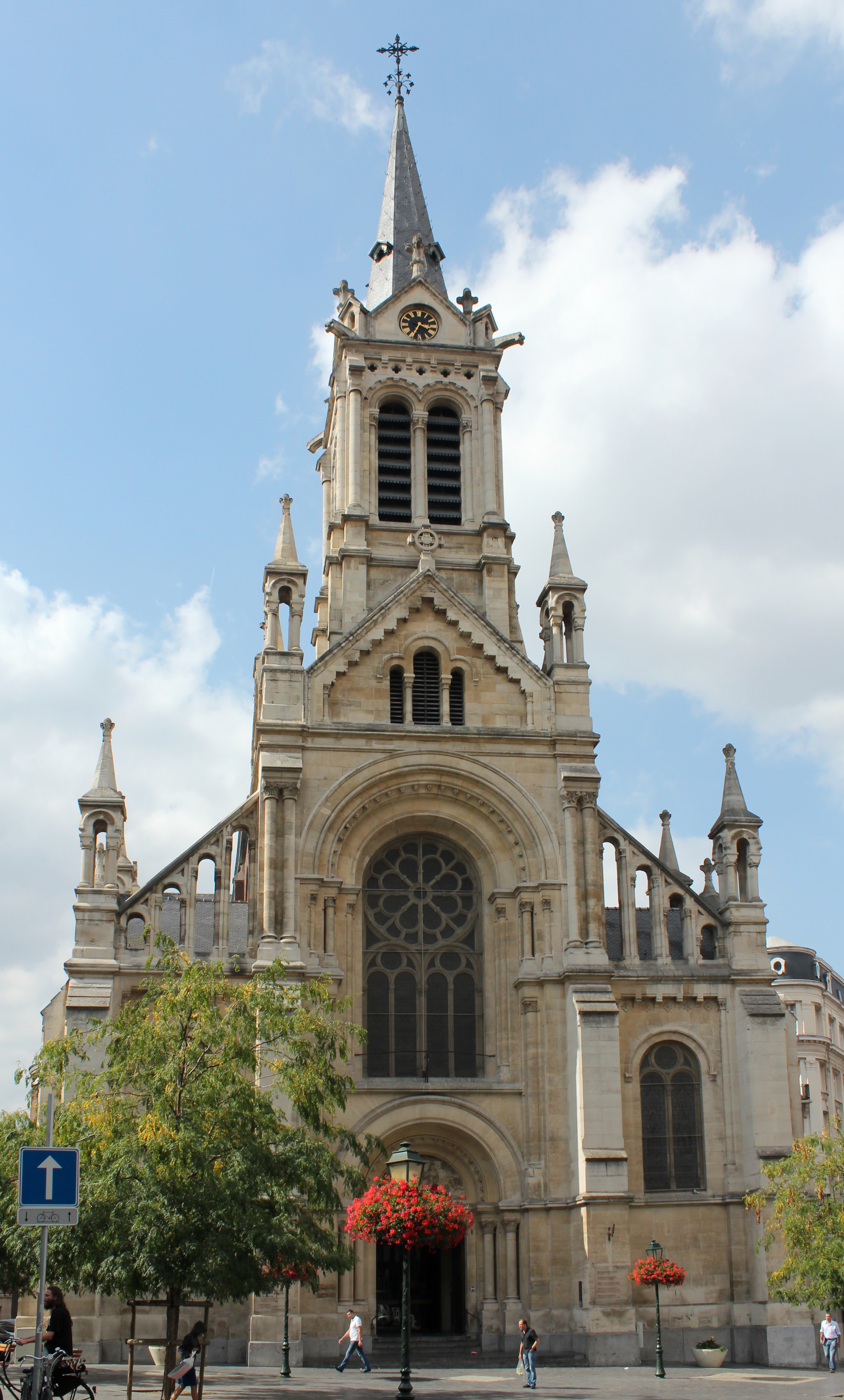
Church of St. Gilles

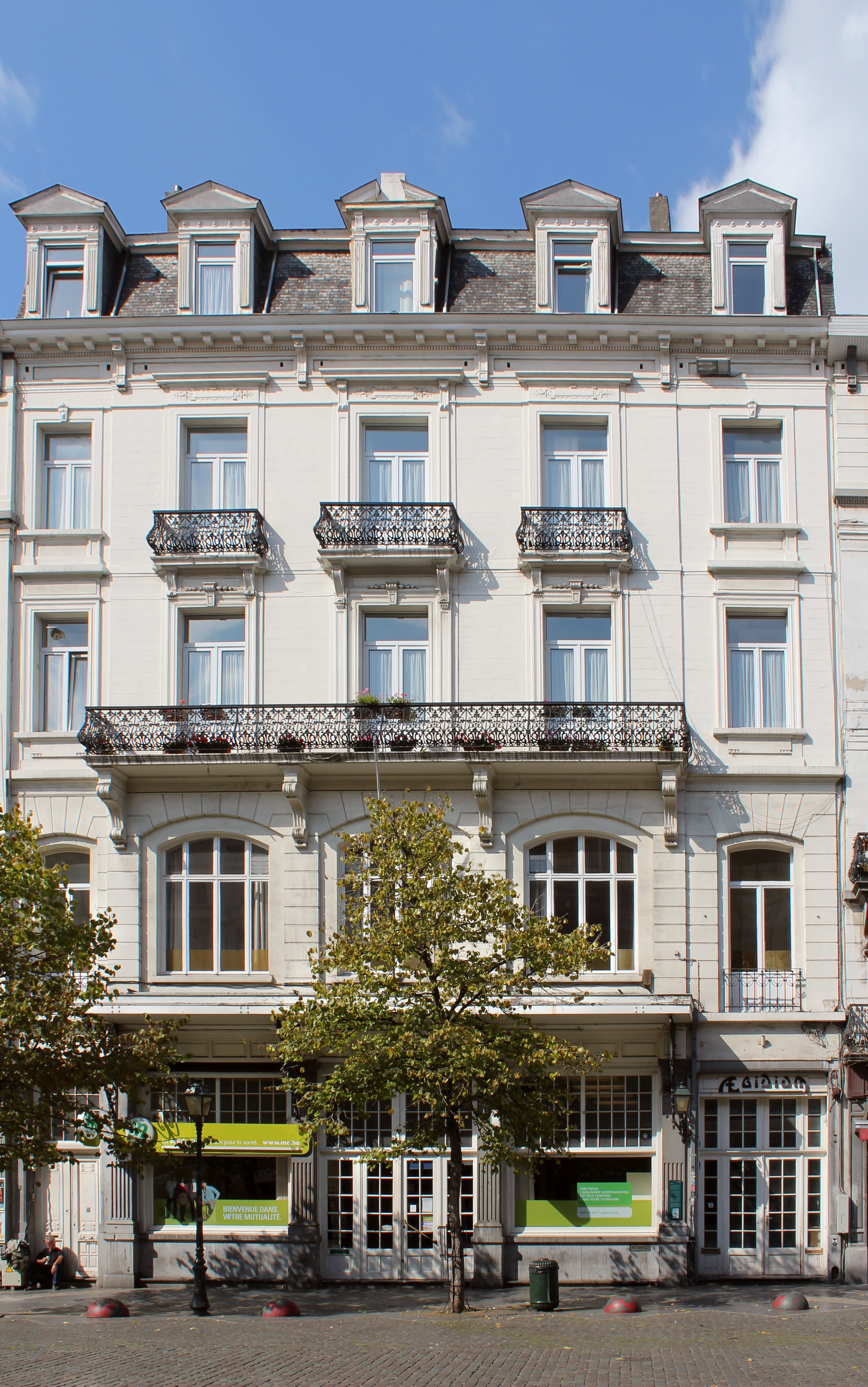
Aegidium

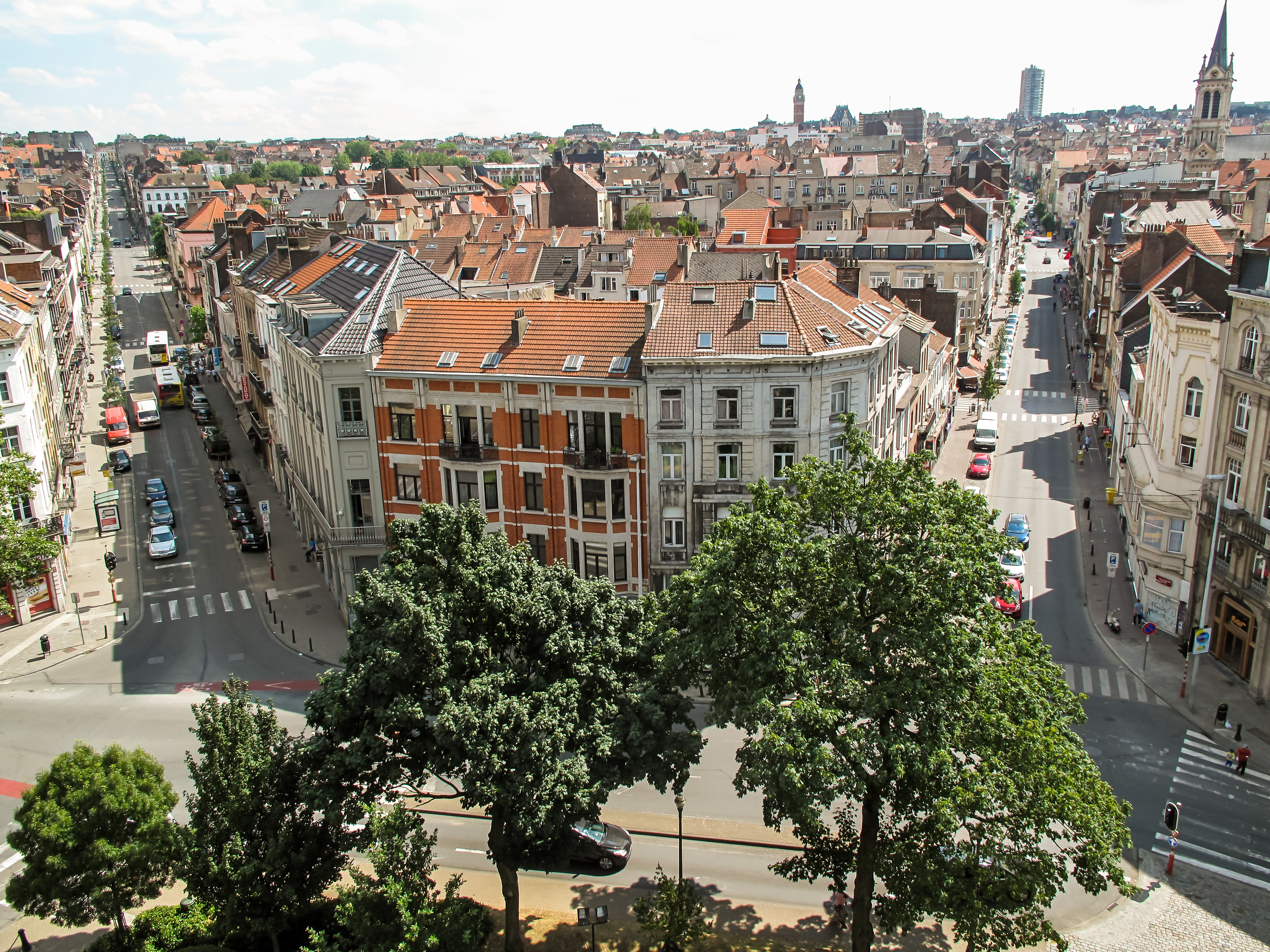
Chaussée de Waterloo/Waterloosesteenweg and Rue de la Victoire/Overwinningsstraat

==== Haut Saint-Gilles/Hoog Sint-Gillis ====
Located in the south of Saint-Gilles.

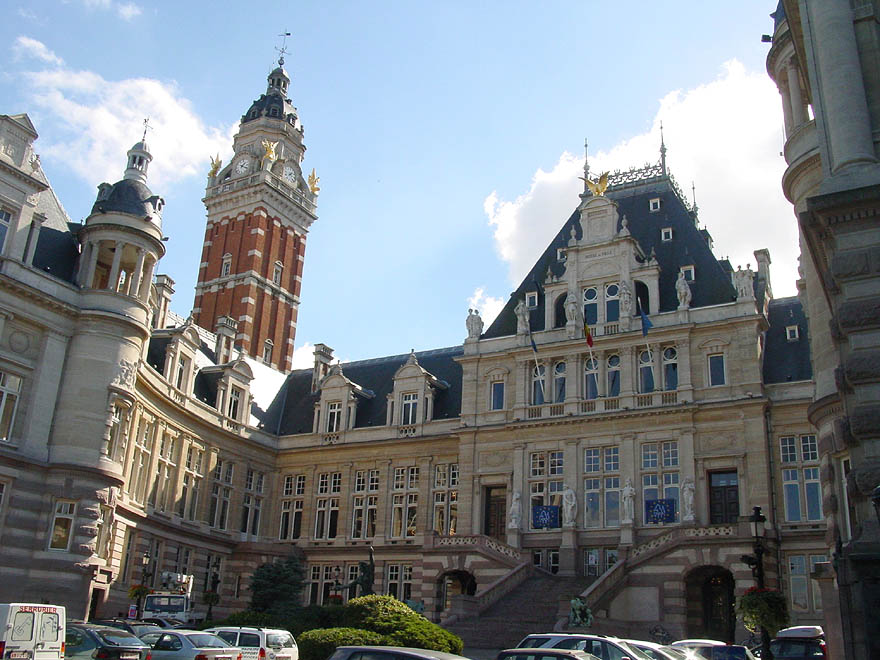
Saint-Gilles' Municipal Hall

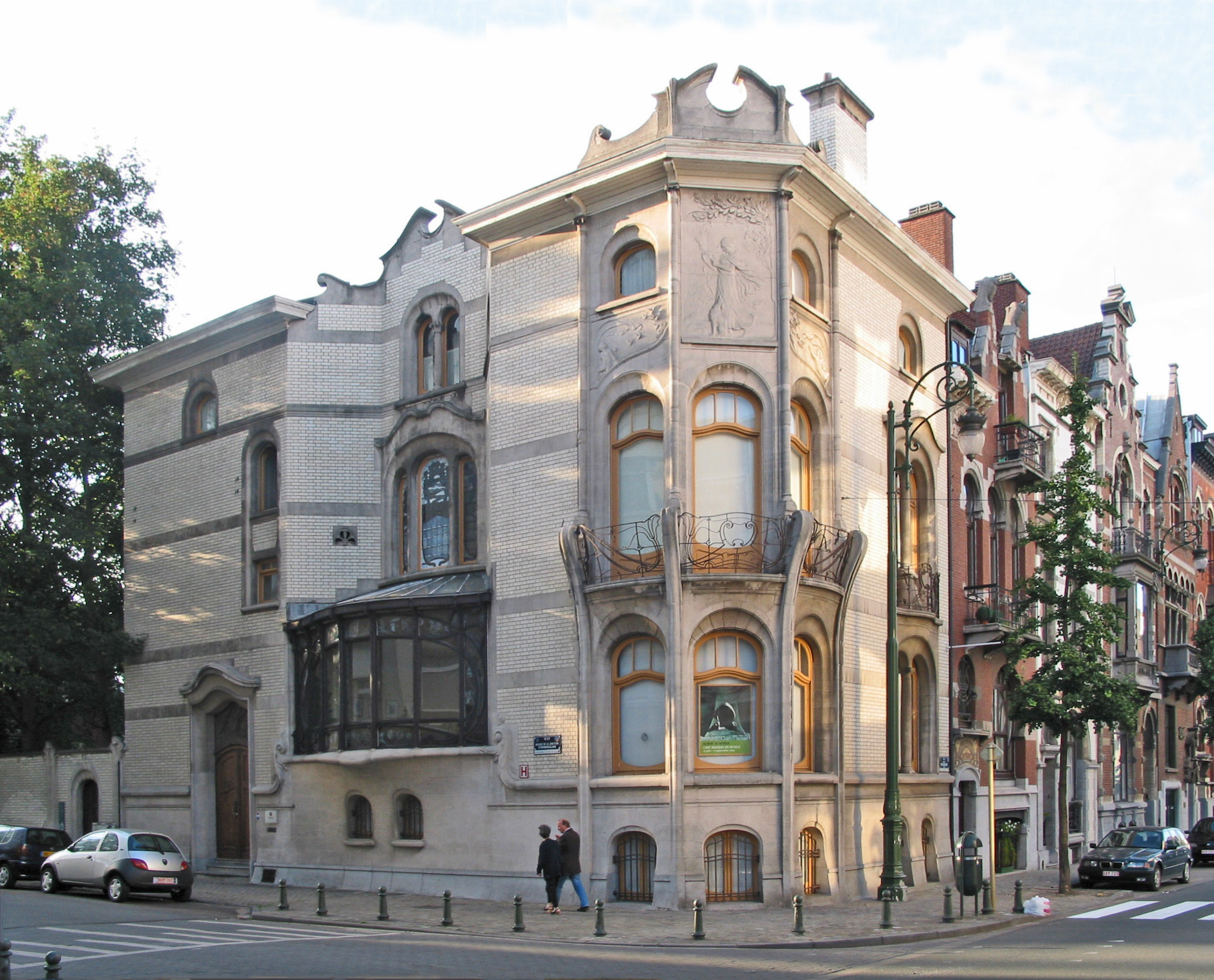
Hôtel Hannon

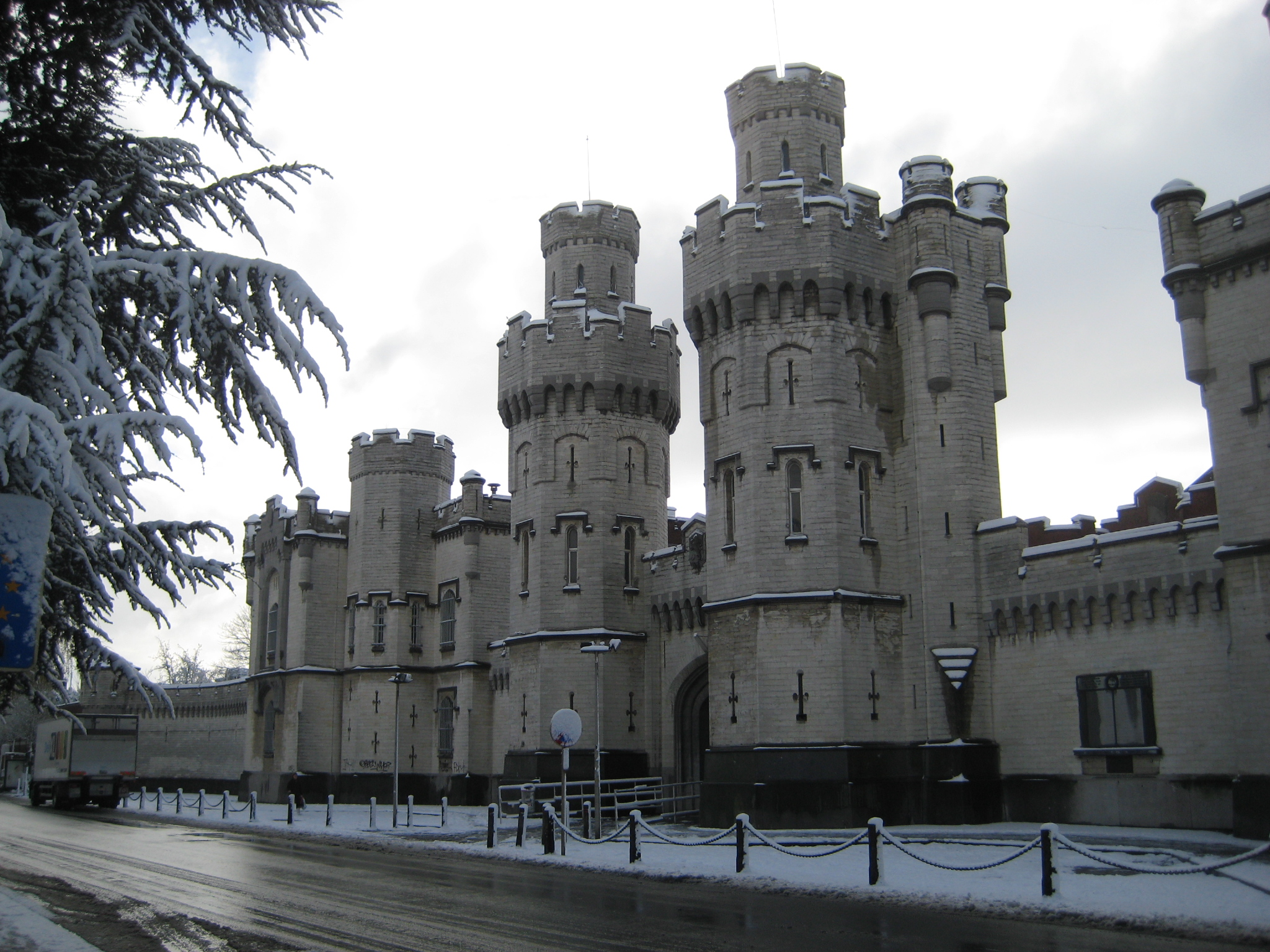
Saint-Gilles Prison

==== Midi Quarter ====
Located in the west of Saint-Gilles, the Midi Quarter (French: Quartier Midi, Dutch: Zuidwijk) is centred around Brussels-South railway station (the city's principal railway station) and thus often serves as a gateway for international travellers. From a socio-economic perspective, however, this district has more in common with neighbouring Cureghem than with upper Saint-Gilles. On both sides of the station—along the Avenue Fonsny/Fonsnylaan, the Place Victor Horta/Victor Hortaplein and the Rue de France/Frankrijkstraat—large buildings (ministries, major companies, etc.) have replaced ageing and neglected housing, following lengthy urban planning battles waged by local residents. Notably, the South Tower, the tallest building in Belgium, stands in front of the station's main exit (the crossroad of the Avenue Fonsny and the Rue Couverte/Bedektestraat) and houses the Belgian Federal Pensions Service (FPS).

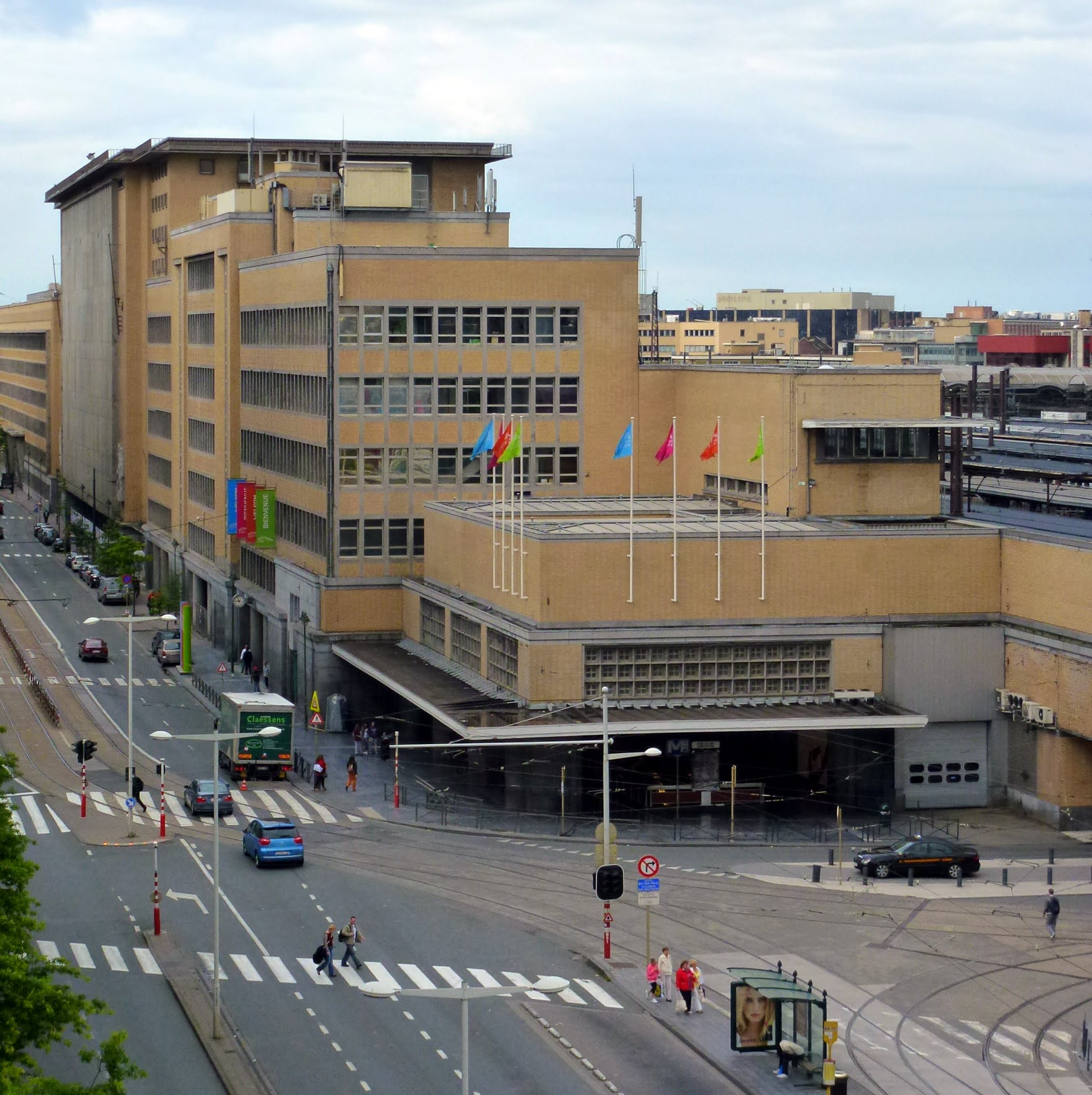
Brussels-South railway station

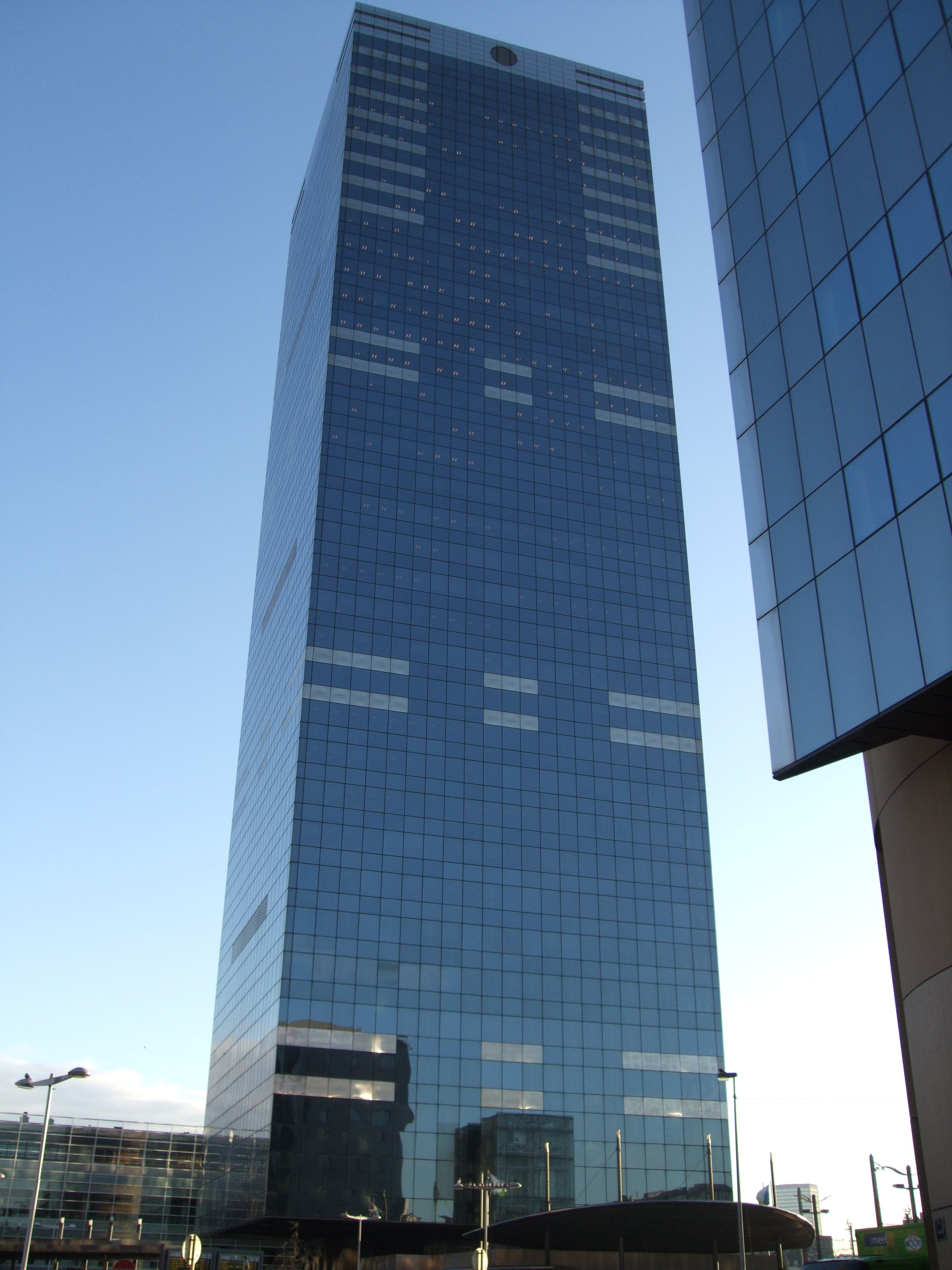
South Tower

=== Saint-Josse-ten-Noode/Sint-Joost-ten-Node ===
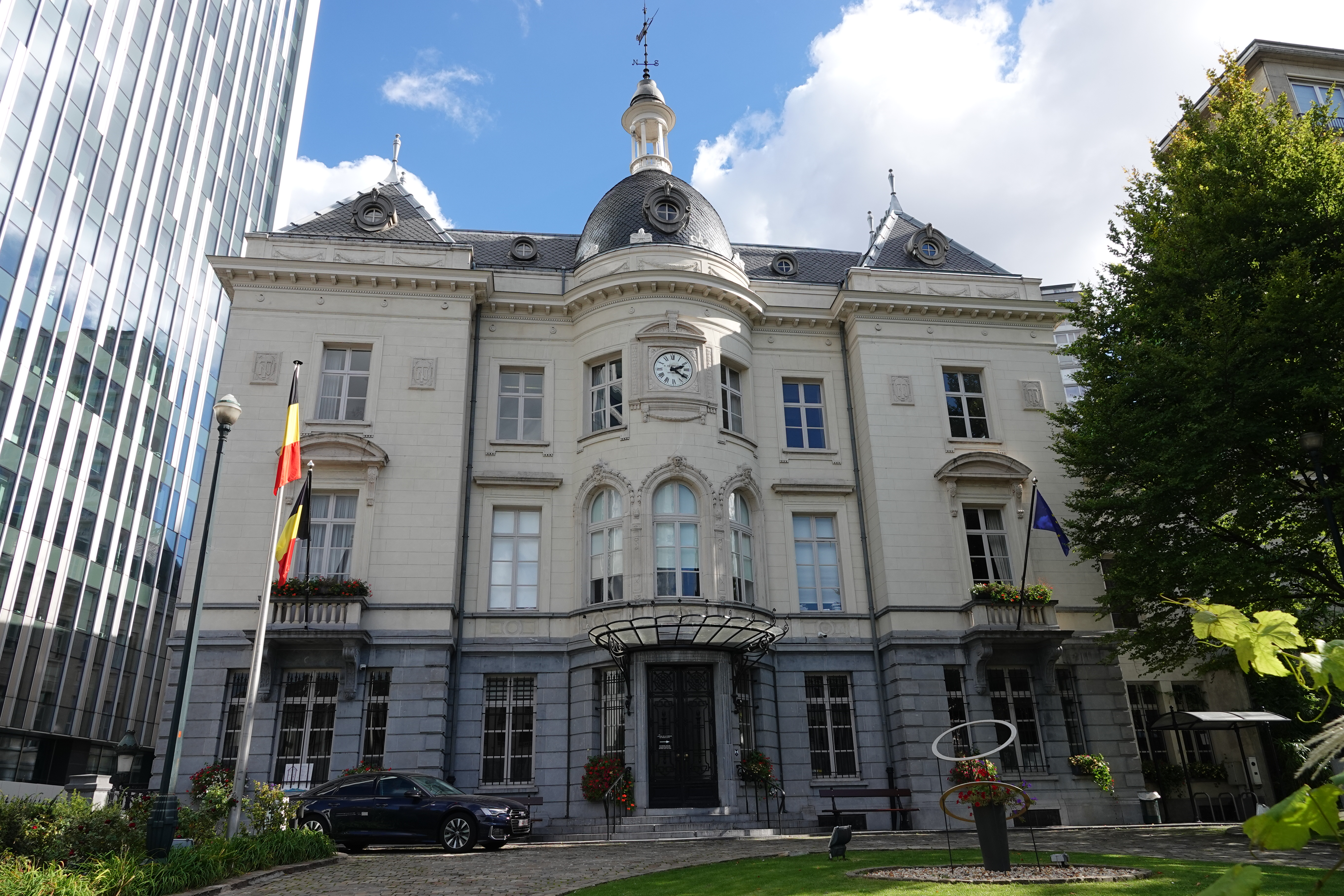
Saint-Josse-ten-Noode's Municipal Hall

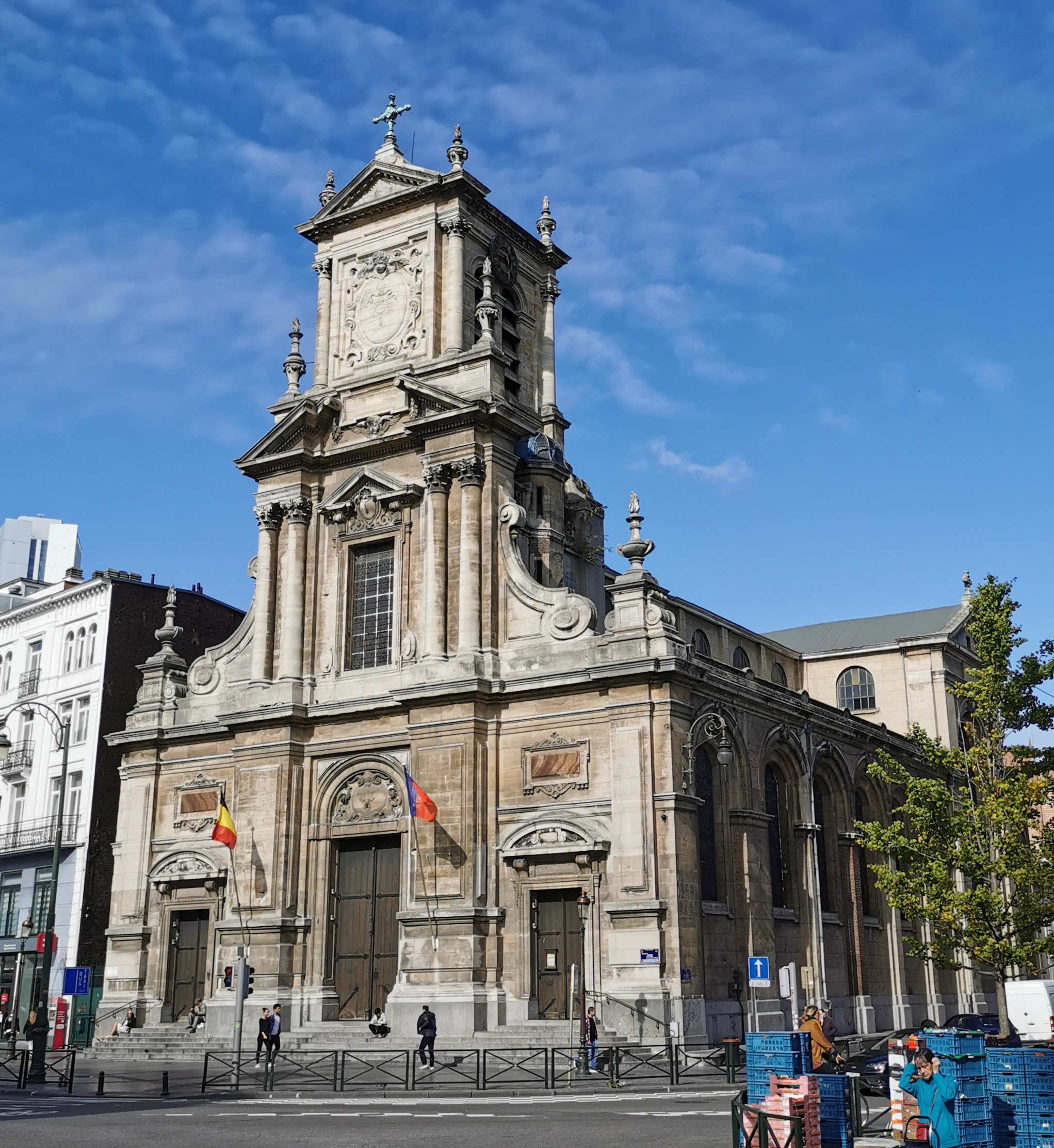
Church of St. Josse

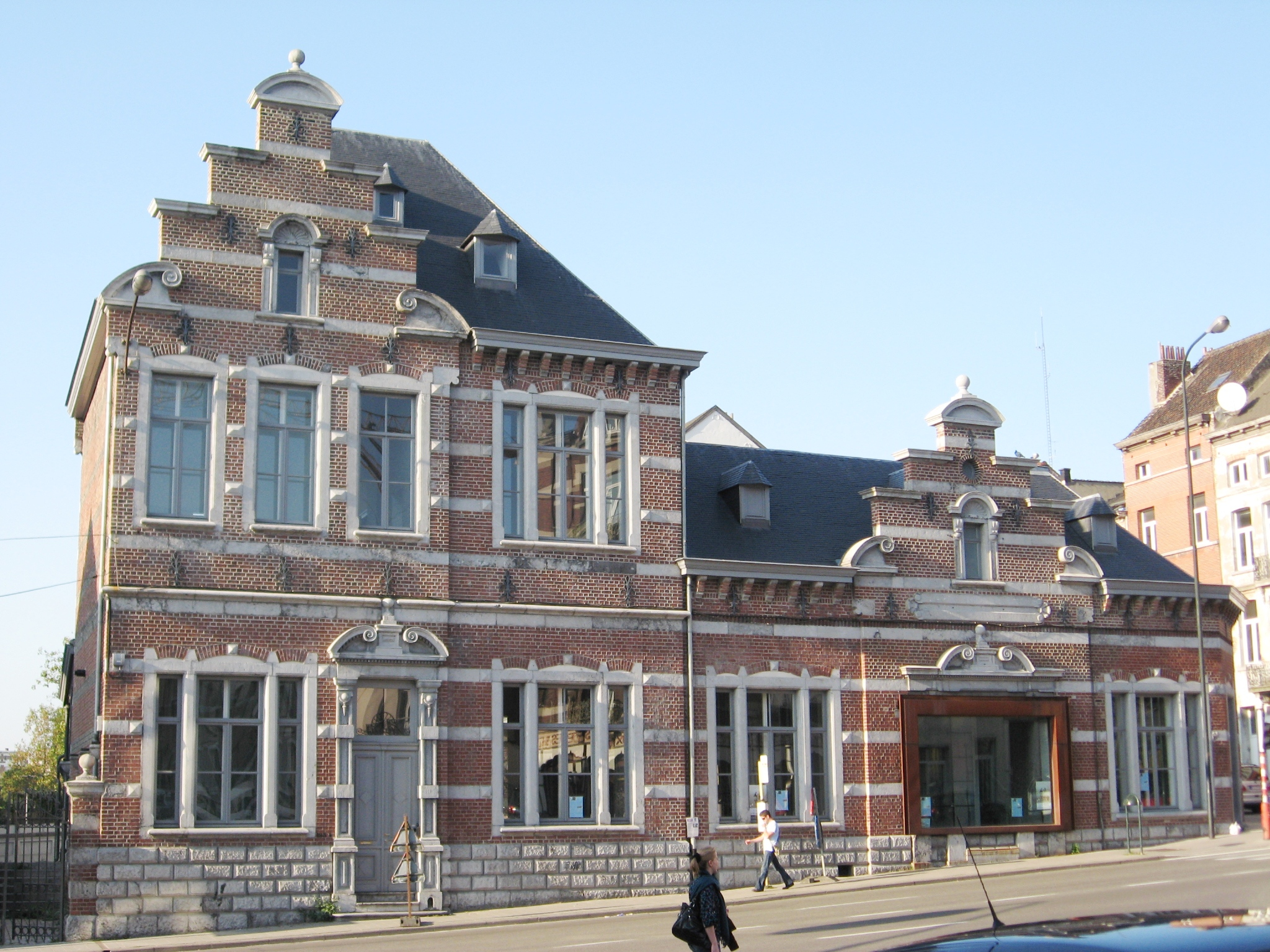
Saint-Josse-ten-Noode railway station

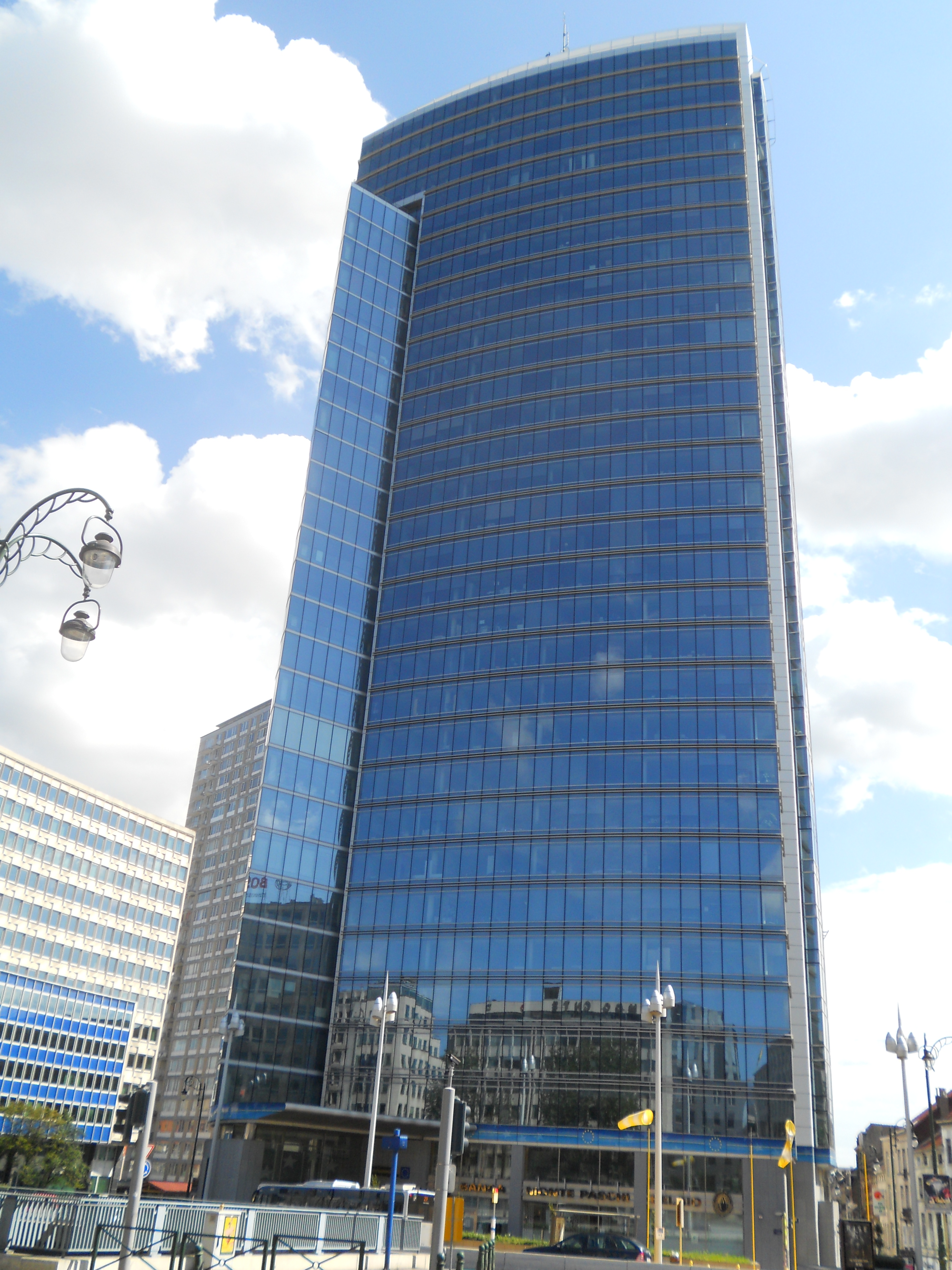
Madou Plaza Tower

=== Schaerbeek/Schaarbeek ===
==== Colignon ====
The Colignon district (French: Quartier Colignon, Dutch: Colignonwijk) is the historical centre of Schaerbeek. Its focal point, the Place Colignon/Colignonplein, is dominated by the imposing Municipal Hall of Schaerbeek. The area has undergone profound transformations over the decades and it is now a vibrant commercial and residential neighbourhood.

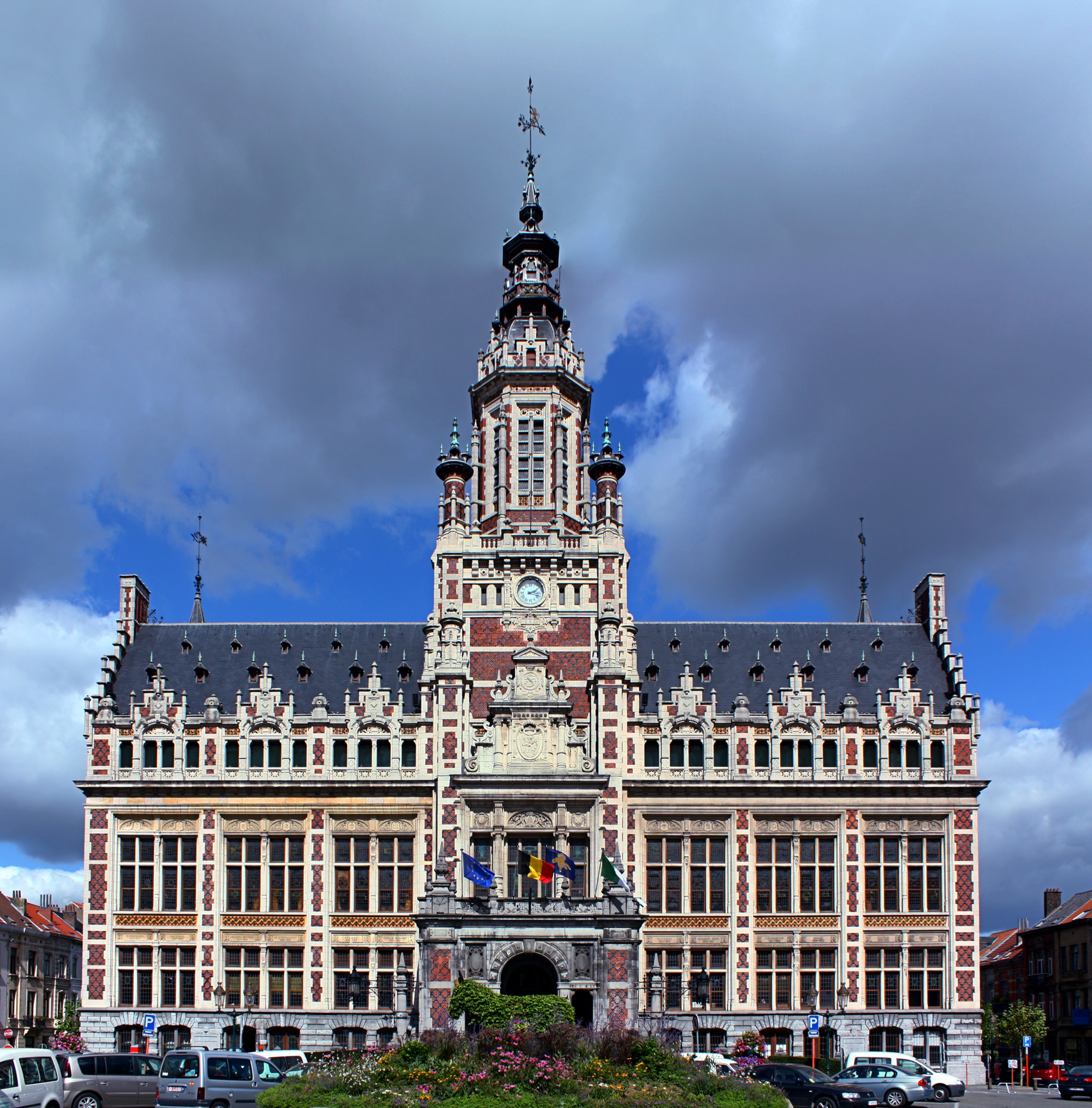
Schaerbeek's Municipal Hall

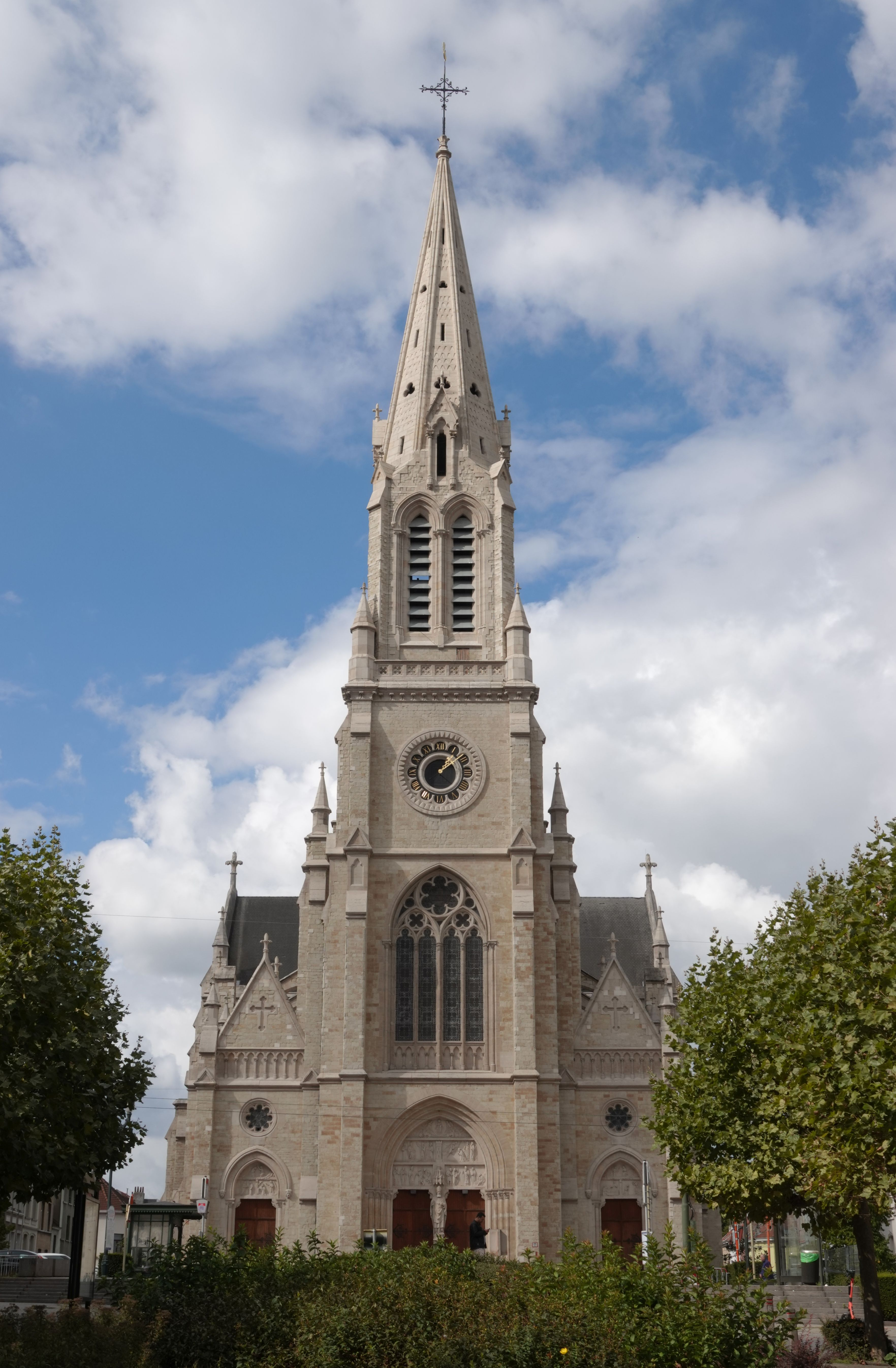
Church of St. Servatius

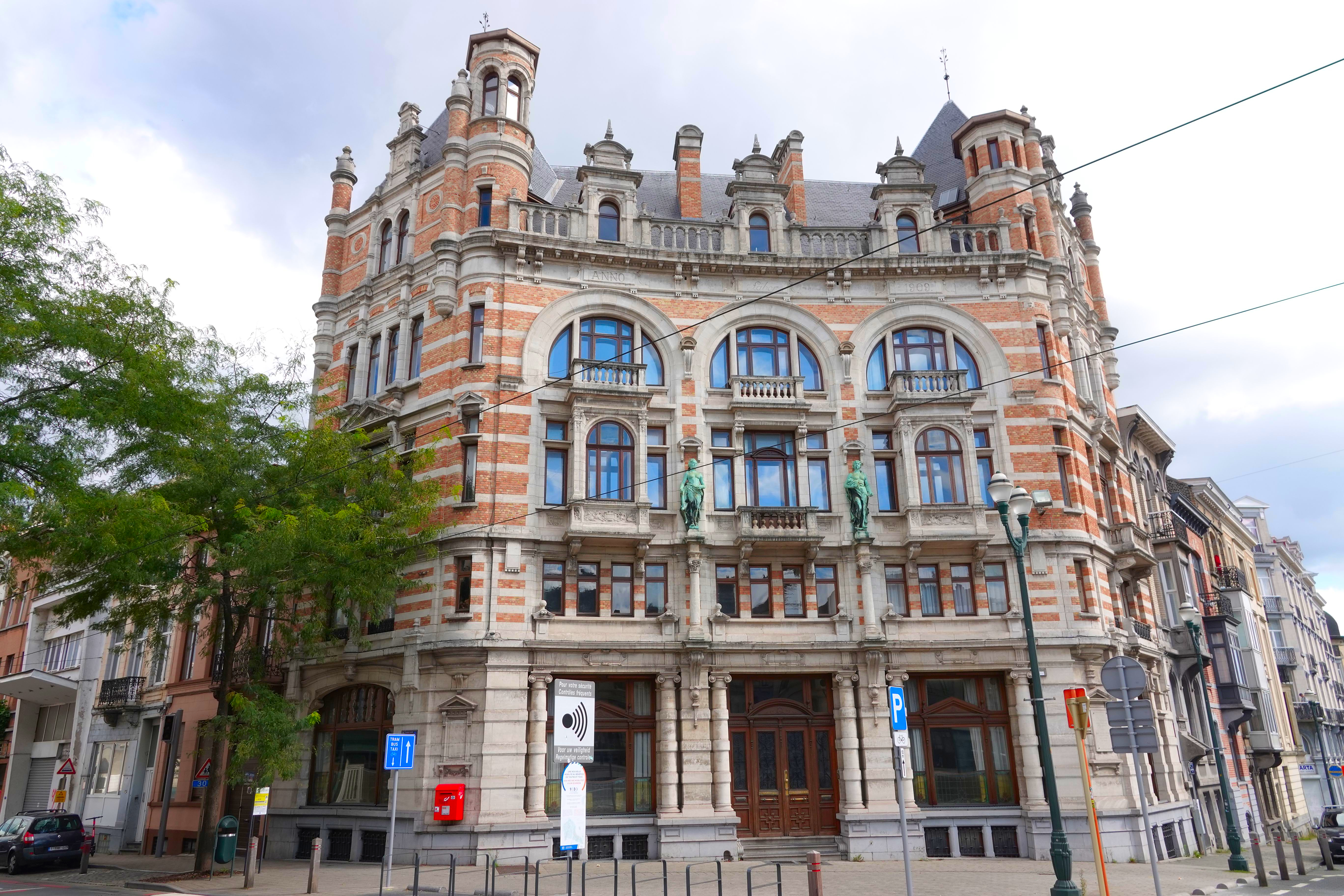
Avenue Louis Bertrand/Louis Bertrandlaan

==== Brabant Quarter ====
Located in the west of Schaerbeek, the Brabant Quarter (French: Quartier Brabant, Dutch: Brabantwijk) is the district east of Brussels-North railway station.

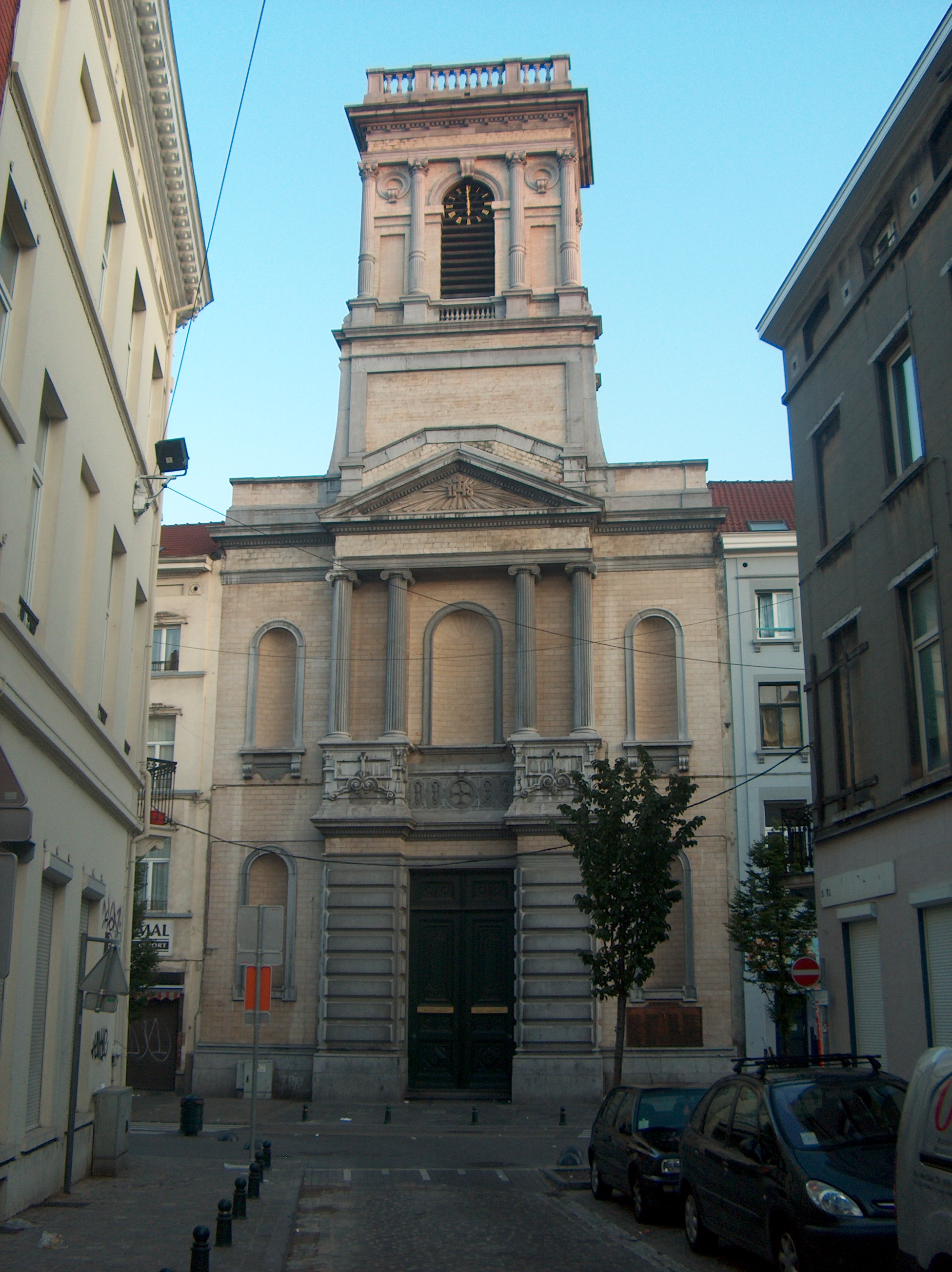
Church of St. John and St. Nicholas

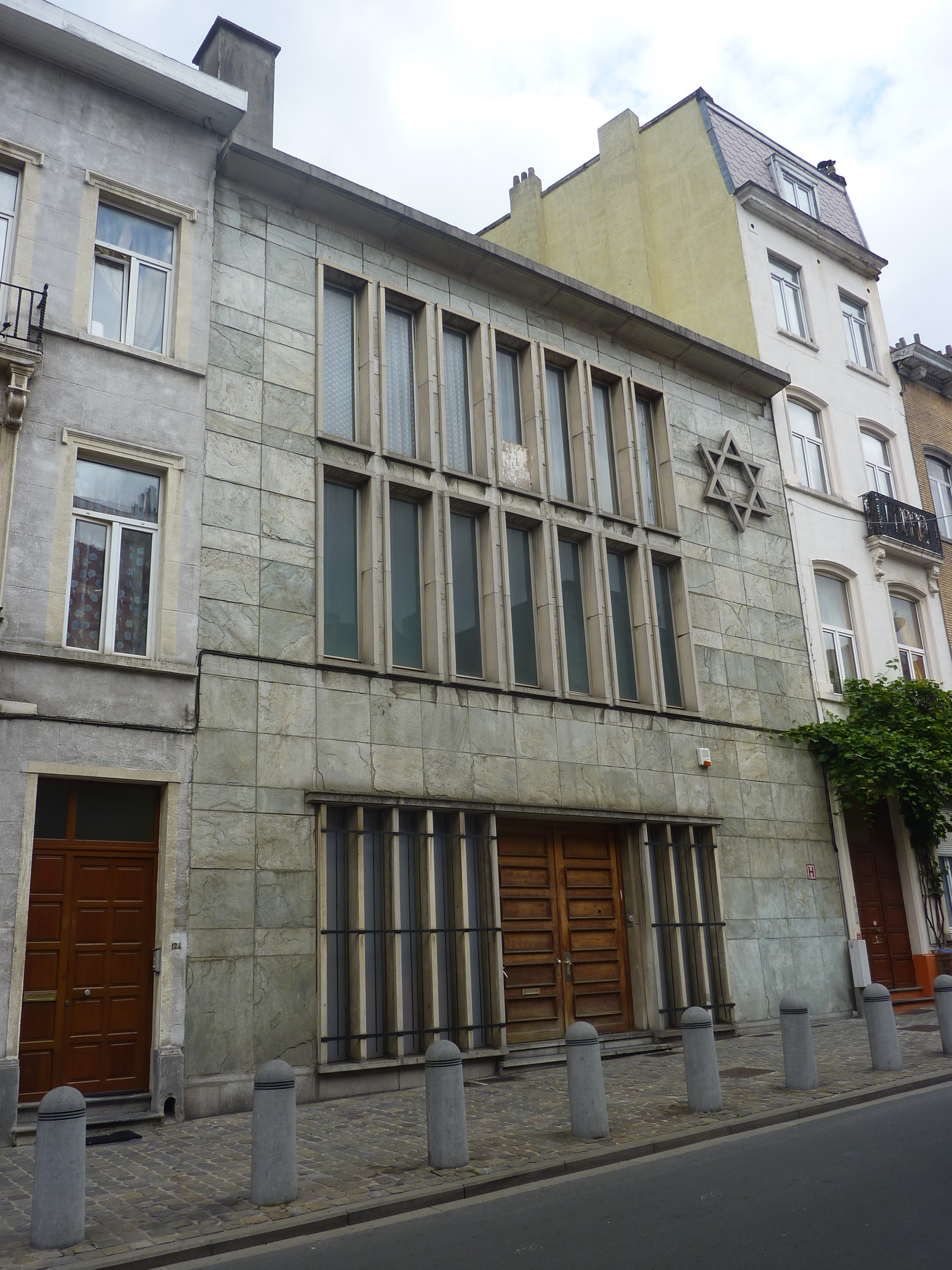
Ahavat Shalom Synagogue

==== Little Anatolia (Sainte-Marie/Sint-Maria) ====
Located in the south-west of Schaerbeek, the area around St. Mary's Royal Church is home to Brussels' large Belgian Turkish community. It is dubbed the "Little Anatolia" (French: la petite Anatolie, Dutch: het Klein Anatolië) because of all the Turkish restaurants and shops on the Chaussée de Haecht/Haachtsesteenweg. The area is also home to a significant Belgian Moroccan population and other immigrant communities such as Spanish, Congolese, and Asian immigrants. However, the district offers a social mix because of the numerous schools and cultural centres like the Halles de Schaerbeek/Hallen van Schaarbeek, as well as the proximity of the Rue Royale/Koningsstraat.

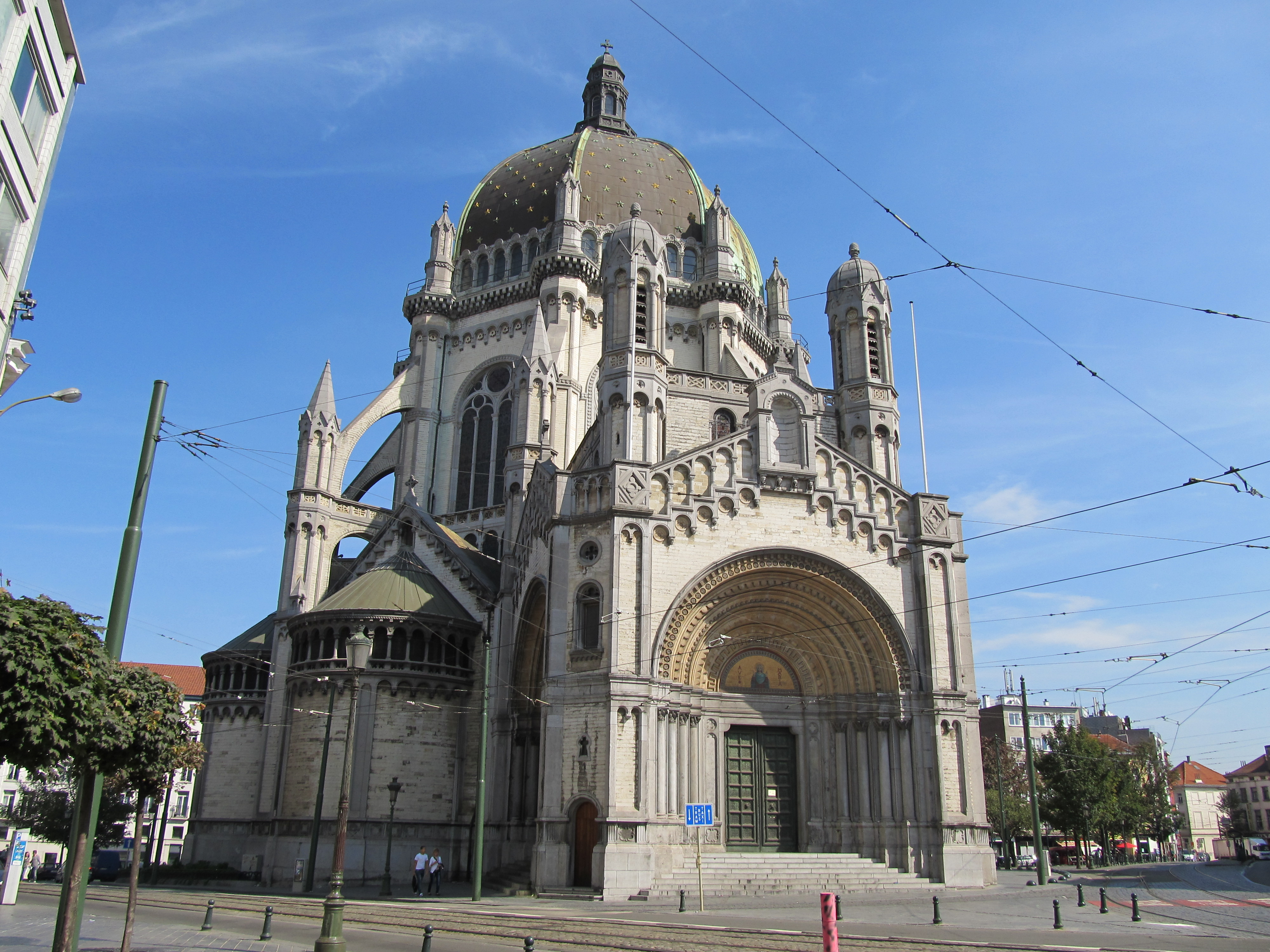
St. Mary's Royal Church

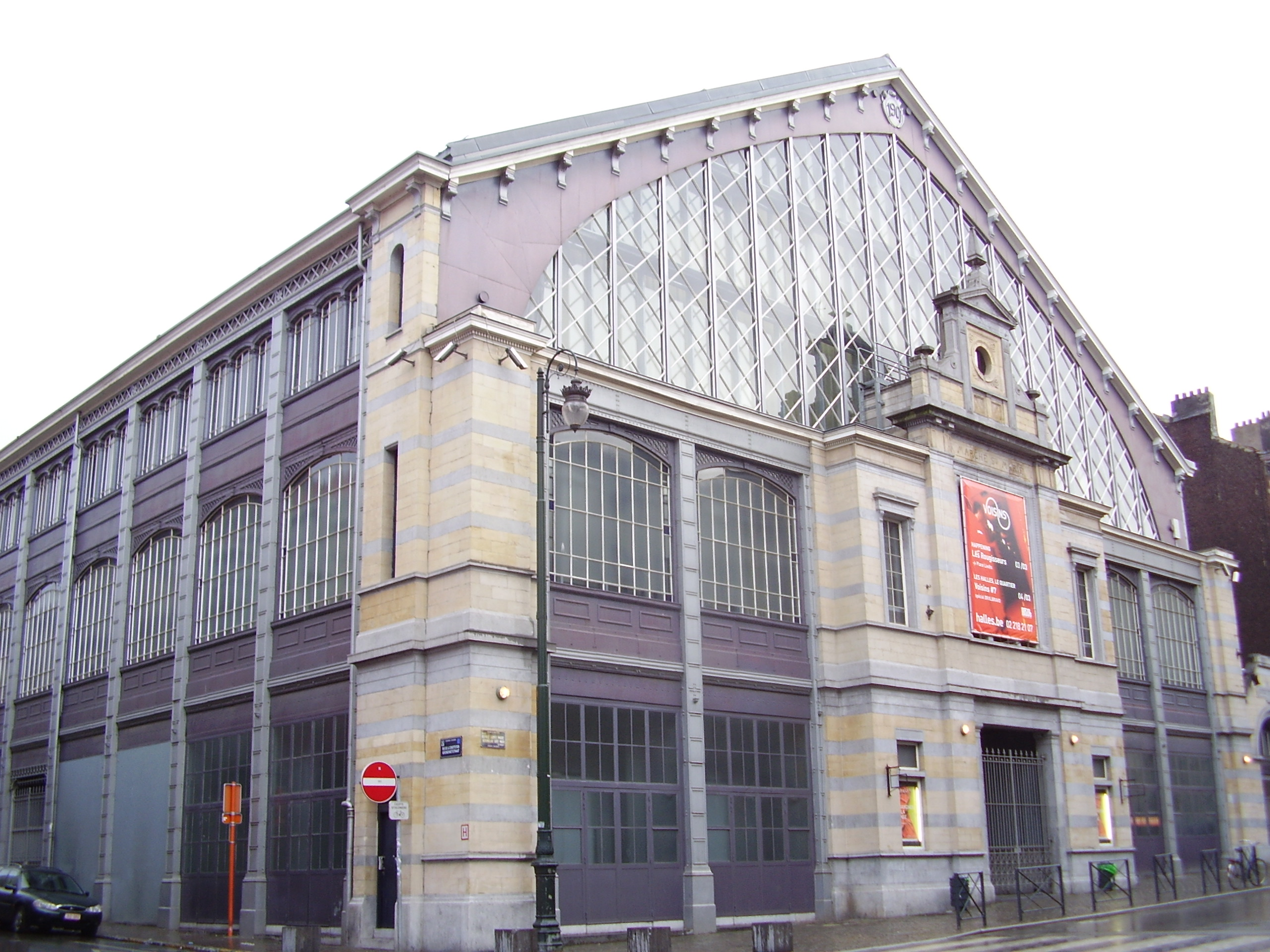
Halles de Schaerbeek/Hallen van Schaarbeek

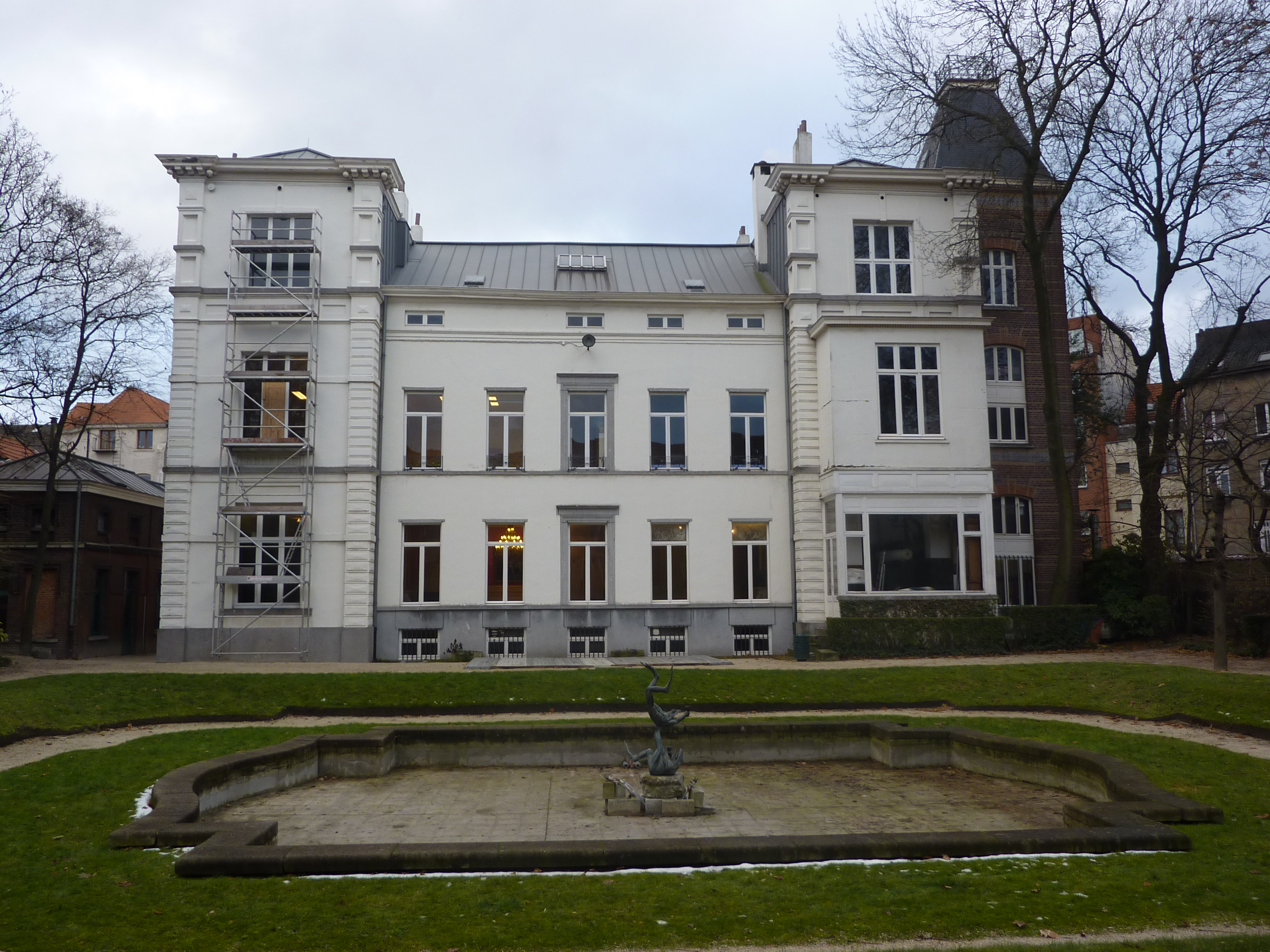
La Maison des Arts

==== Dailly ====
The Dailly district (French: Quartier Dailly, Dutch: Daillywijk), formerly known as Monrose, is located in the southern part of Schaerbeek, on the border with Saint-Josse-ten-Noode. It is bounded by the Avenue Rogier/Rogierlaan to the north, the Chaussée de Louvain/Leuvensesteenweg to the south-east and the Avenue Paul Deschanel/Paul Deschanellaan to the west. It owes its name in part to the Place Dailly/Daillyplein and the Avenue Dailly/Daillylaan, which runs through the neighbourhood. The focal point is undoubtedly the site of the former Prince Baudouin Barracks, called the Dailly Barracks by the people of Brussels. This imposing military building was partially demolished at the end of the 1990s and its front part has been converted into luxury housing and shops. The district is mainly made up of housing, but also includes shops and small industries.

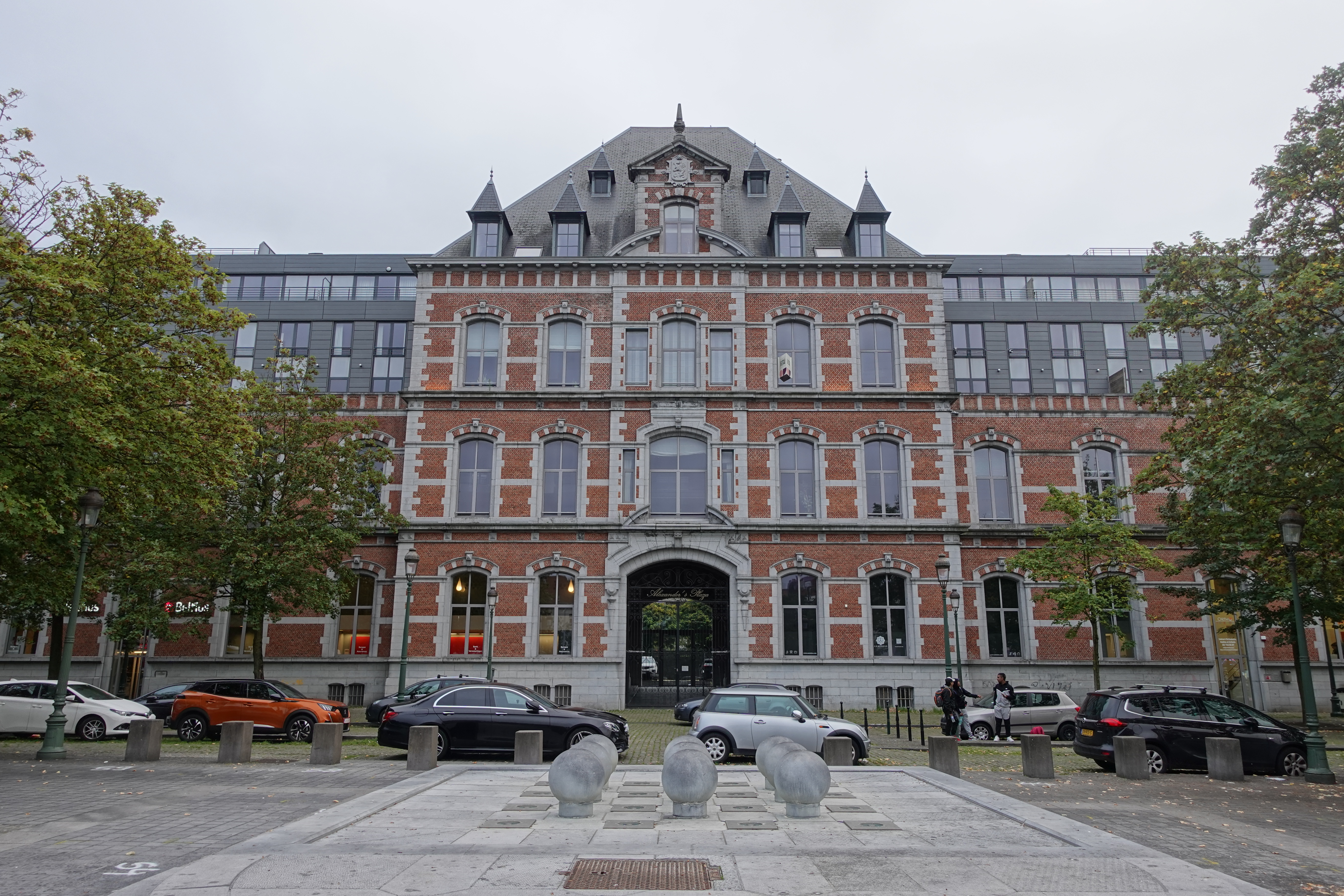
Prince Baudouin Barracks and Dailly Fountain

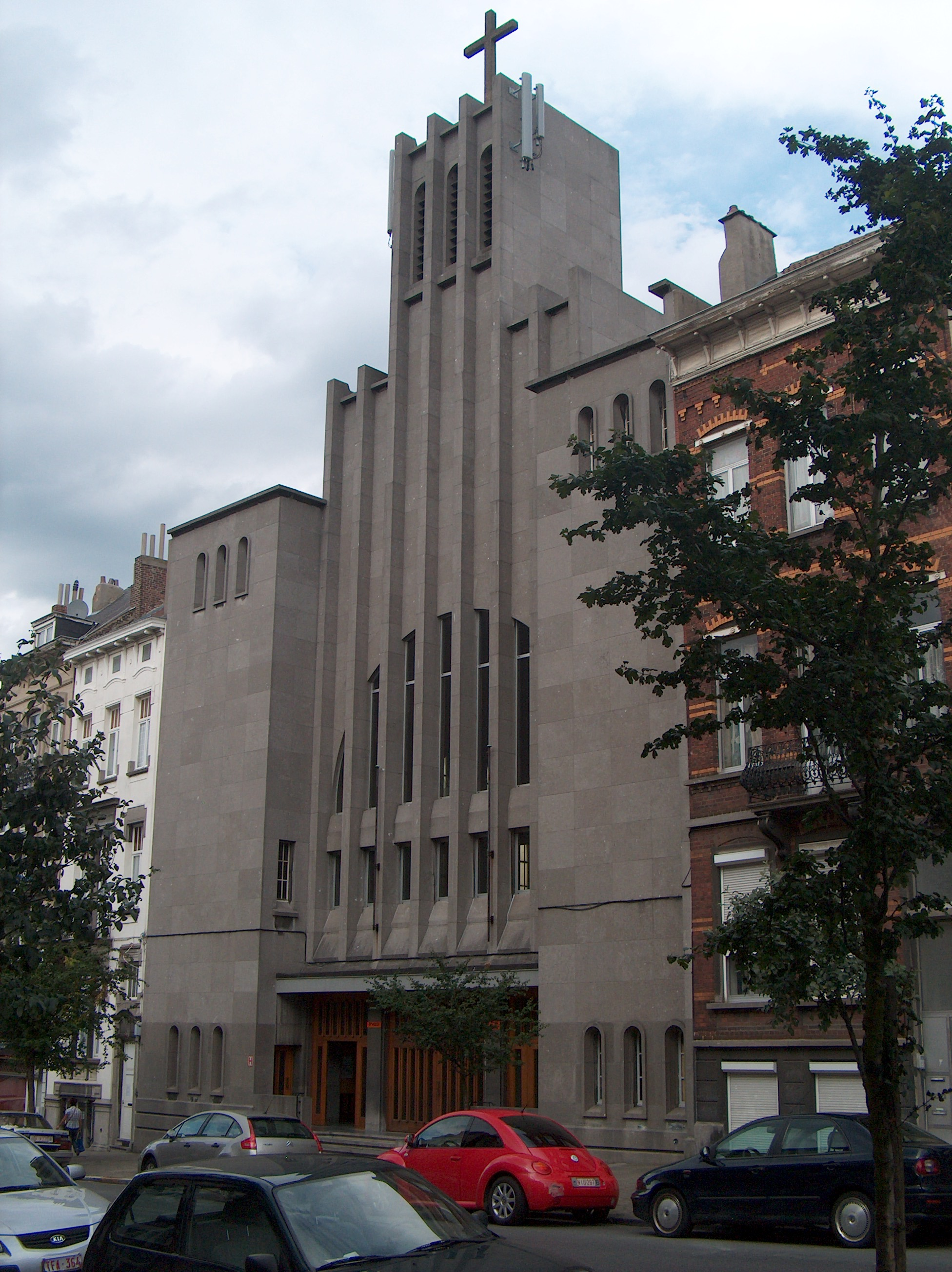
Church of St. Alice

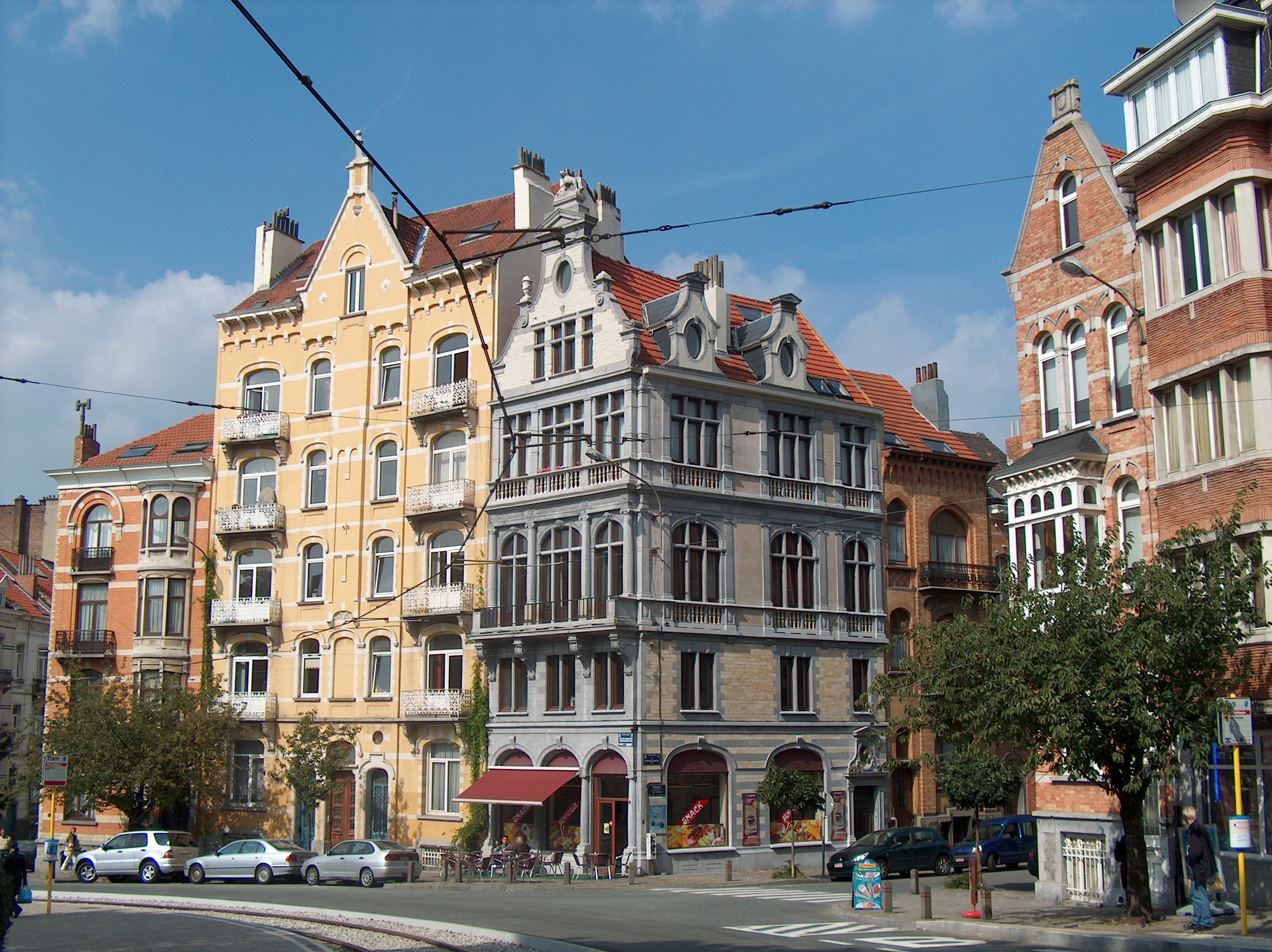
Place des Bienfaiteurs/Weldoenersplein

==== Plasky (Diamant) ====
The Plasky district (French: Quartier Plasky, Dutch: Plaskywijk) or Diamant district (French: Quartier Diamant, Dutch: Diamantwijk), formerly Linthout, is located in the south-east of Schaerbeek. It is bounded by the Chaussée de Louvain/Leuvensesteenweg to the north, the Rue du Noyer/Notelaarsstraat to the west, the Avenue de Roodebeek/Roodebeeklaan to the south and the Boulevard Auguste Reyers/Auguste Reyerslaan to the east. It is so named because it is crossed by the Avenue du Diamant/Diamantlaan and other streets are named after precious stones. In the middle of this district is the Square des Griottiers/Morelleboomsquare, formed by the intersection of the Avenue Émile Max/Émile Maxlaan, the Avenue Milcamps/Milcampslaan and the Avenue Félix Marchal/Félix Marchallaan.

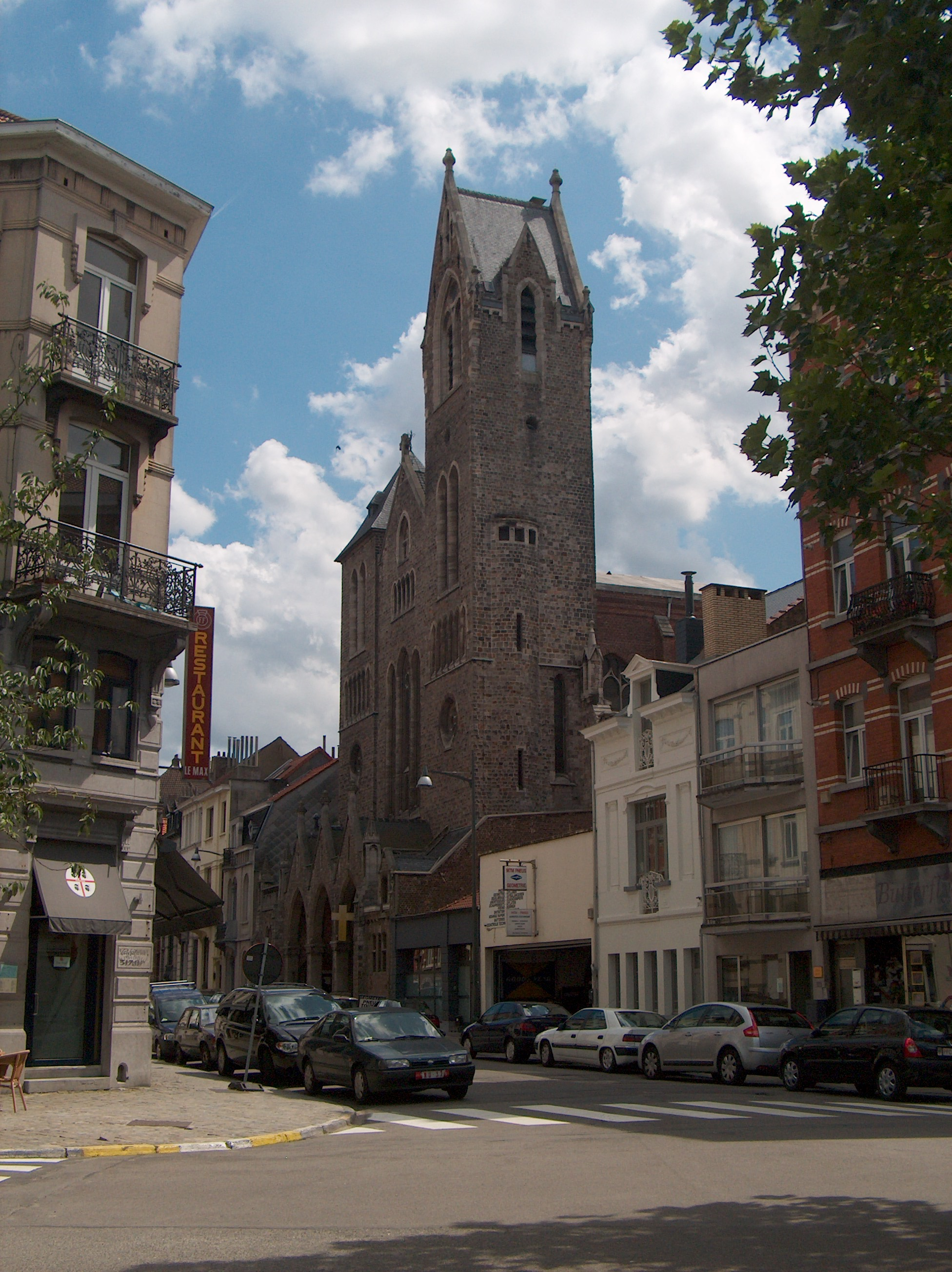
Church of St. Albert

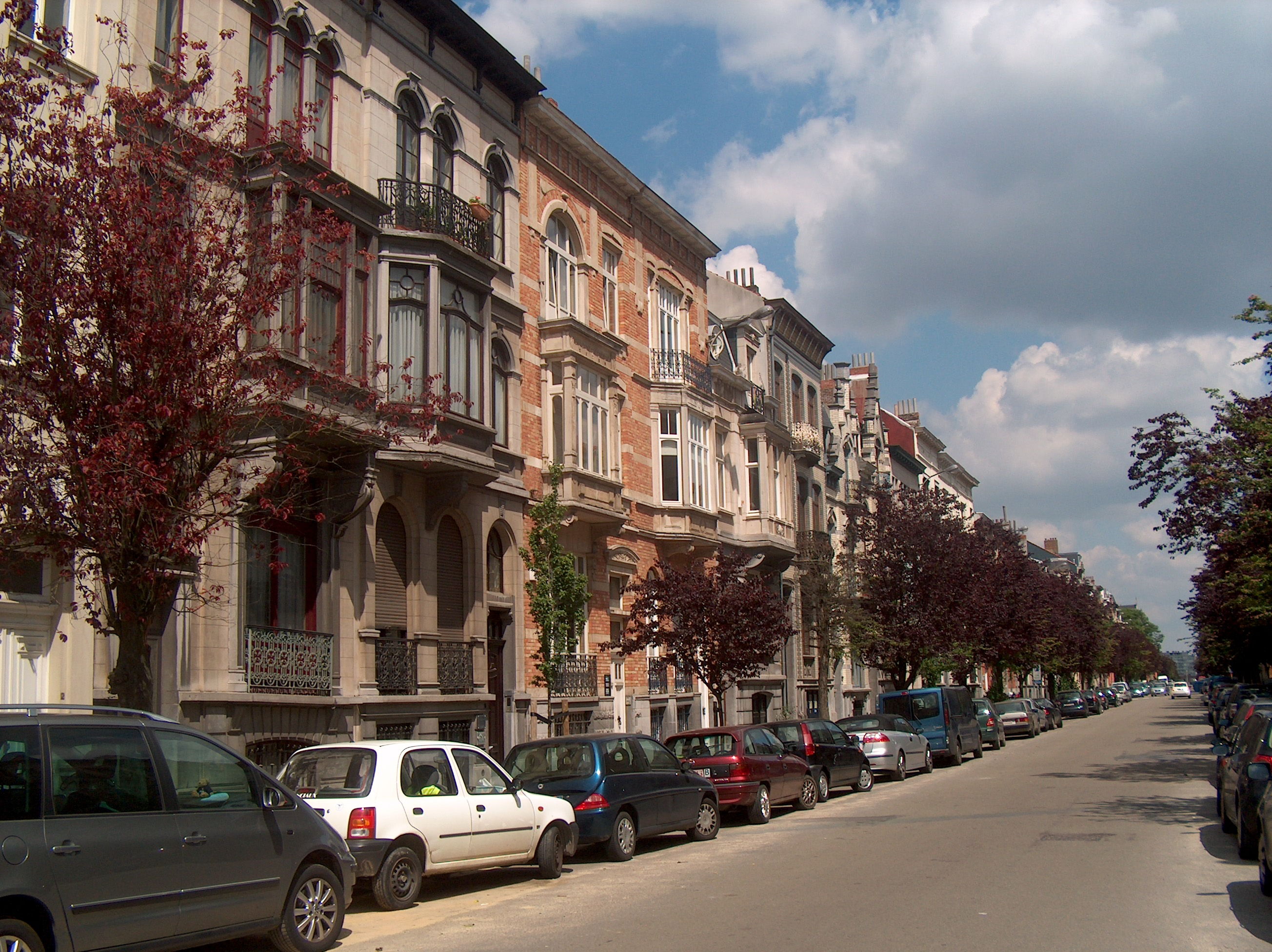
Avenue Milcamps/Milcampslaan

==== Josaphat ====
Located in the centre of Schaerbeek.

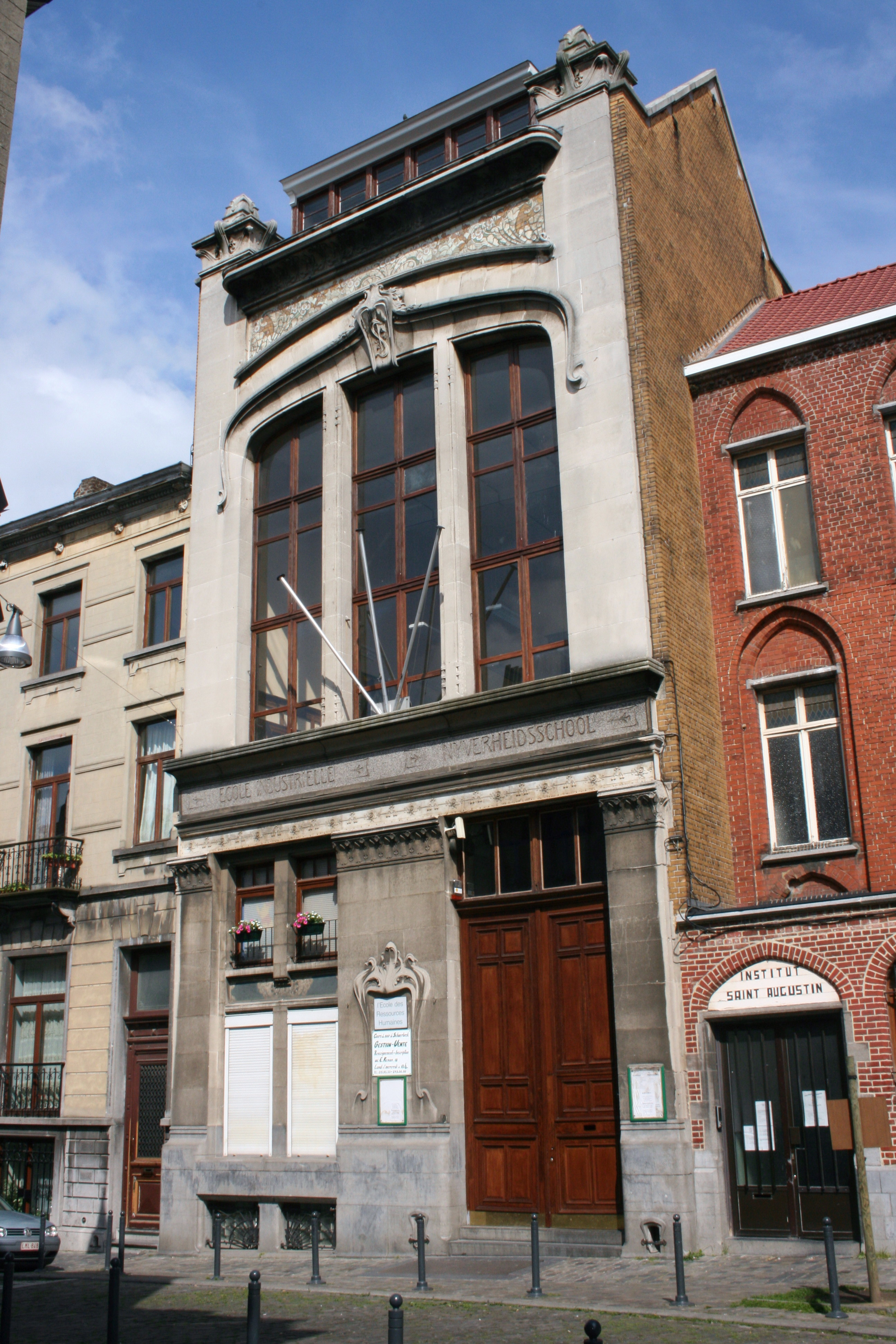
Josaphat School

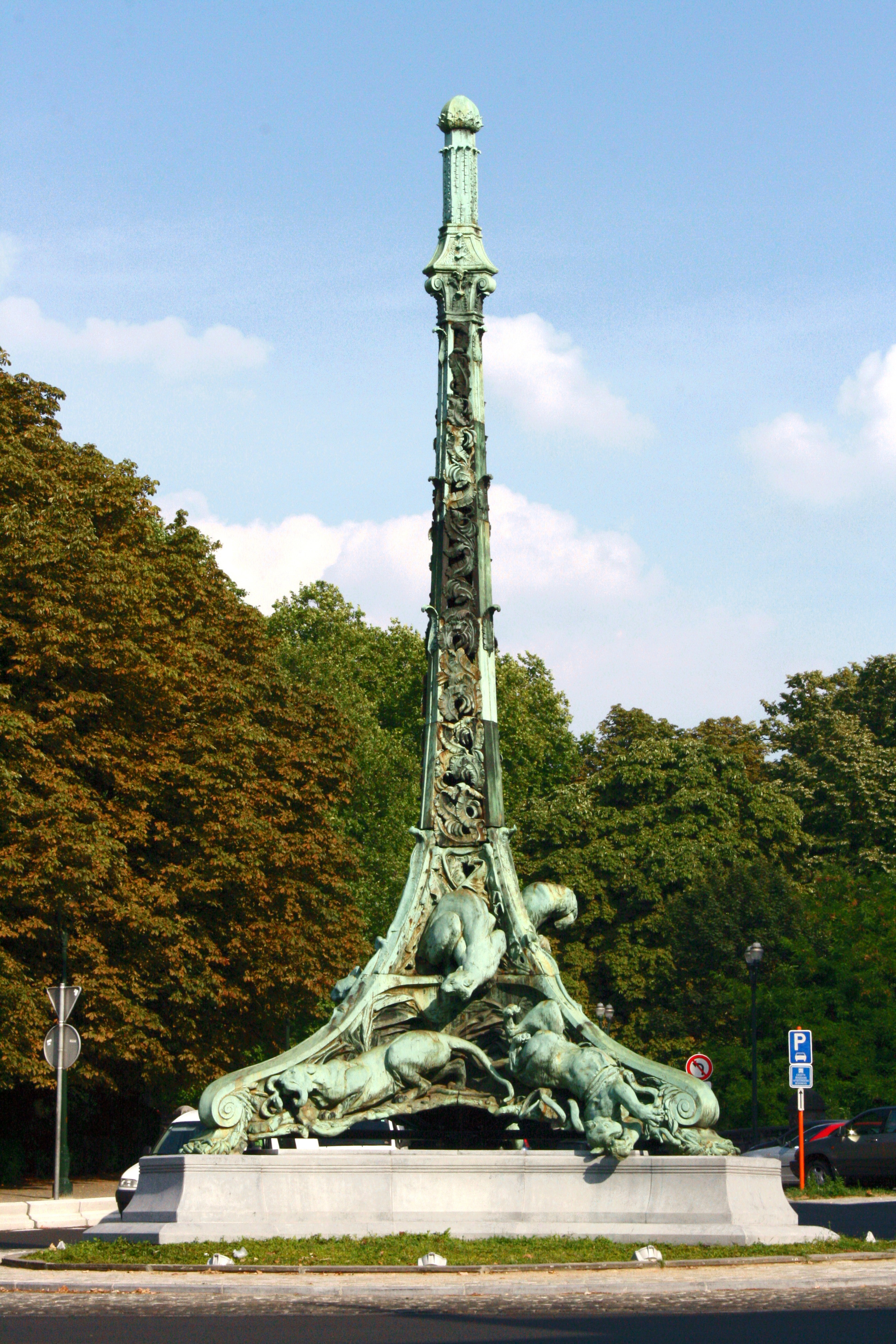
Mast of Lalaing

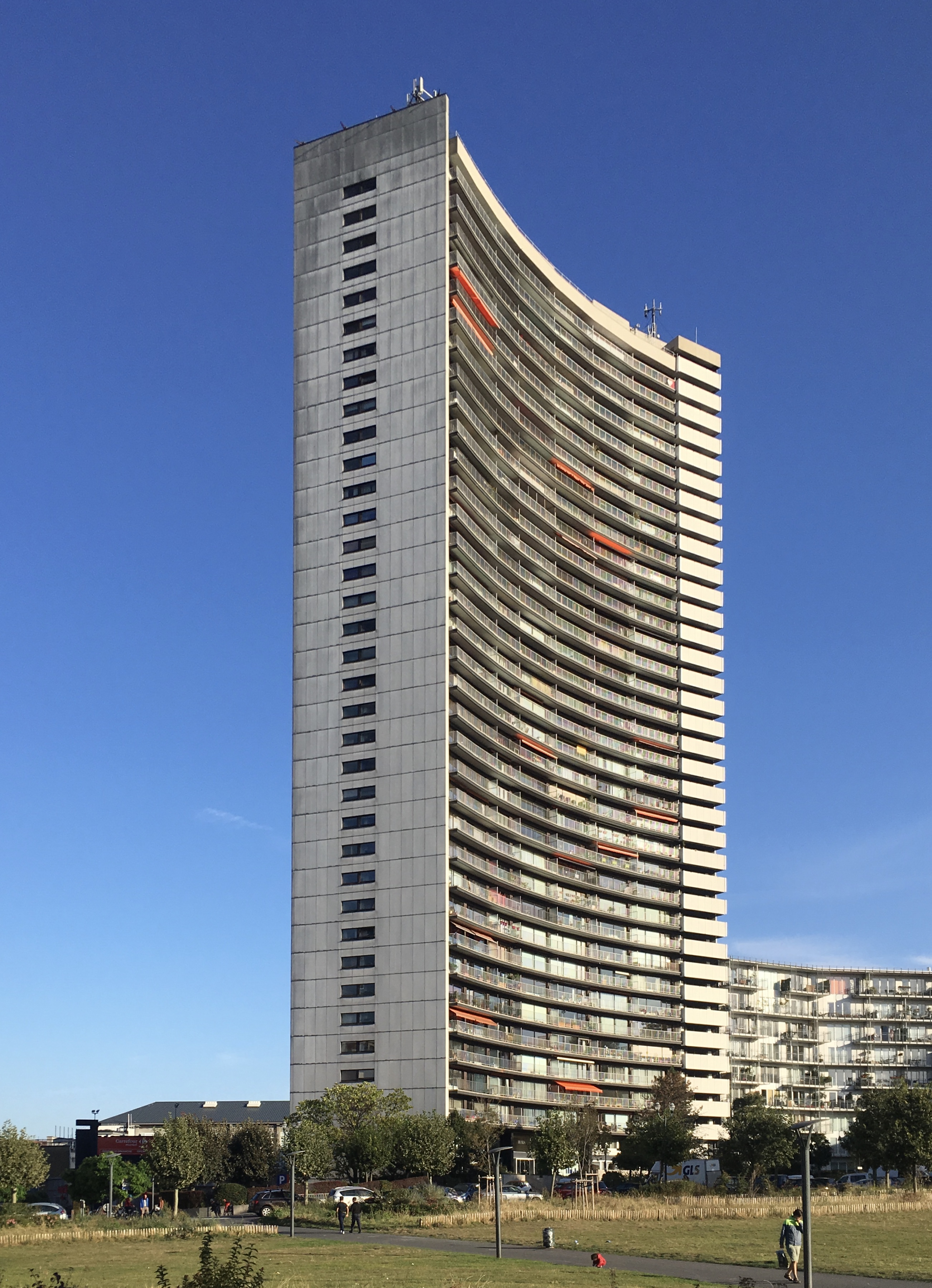
Résidence Brusilia

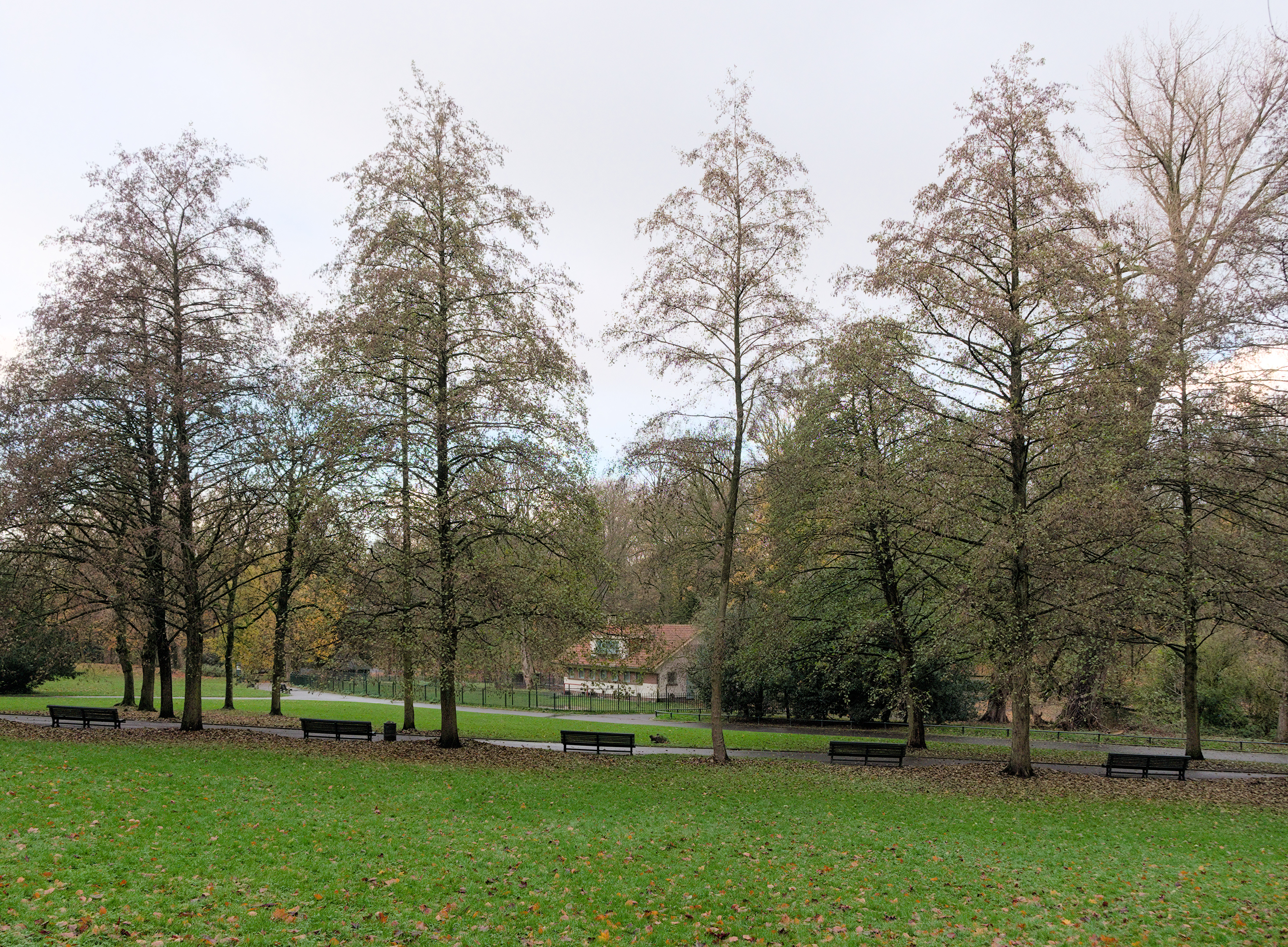
Josaphat Park

==== Flowers Quarter ====
The Flowers Quarter (French: Quartier des Fleurs, Dutch: Bloemenwijk), built from the 1930s onwards, is mostly residential. It is so named because its streets are almost all named after flowers. Bordered on one side by Josaphat Park and on the other by the Terdelt district, it is overlooked by the Church of St. Susanna. The district also features a number of Art Deco buildings.

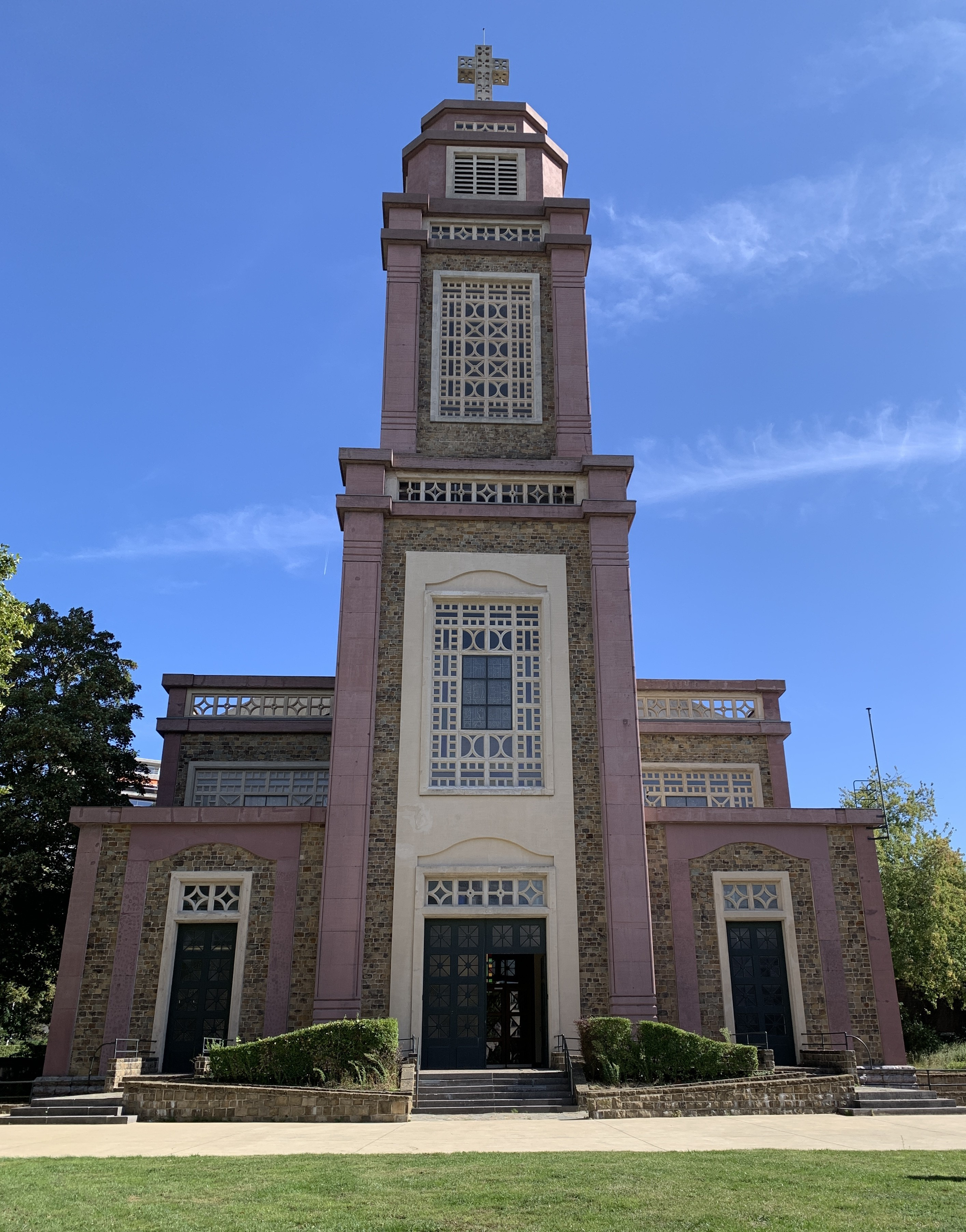
Church of St. Susanna

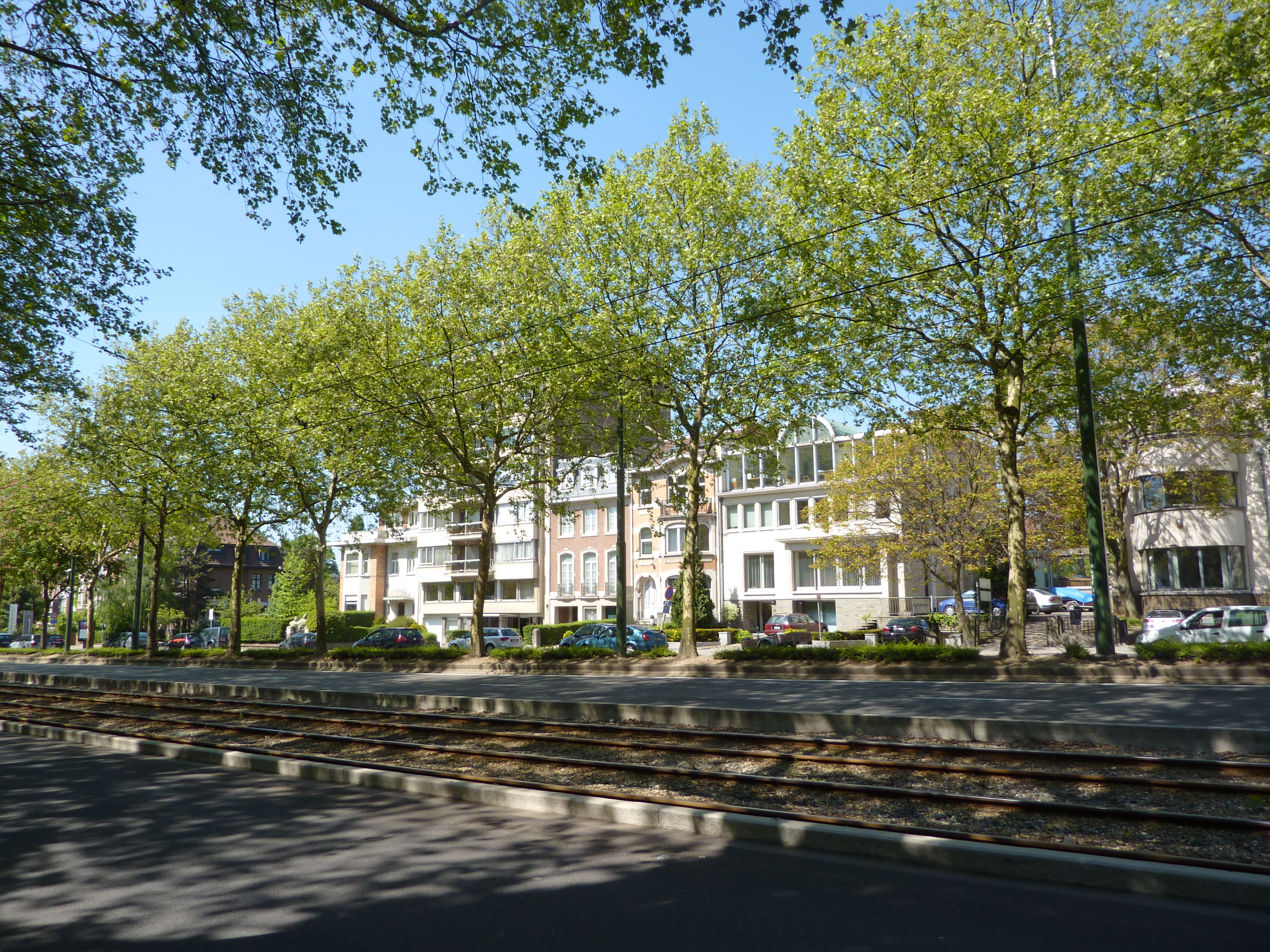
Boulevard Lambermont/Lambermontlaan

==== Monplaisir ====
Monplaisir is located in the eastern part of Schaerbeek. It is named after the former Château Monplaisir, a 17th-century estate built by Baron Pierre-Ferdinand Roose near the Senne. The château was later leased to Prince Charles Alexander of Lorraine, who used it for royal hunts and hosted the region's first horse races. In 1786, it briefly housed Brussels' first porcelain factory before being demolished in 1907.

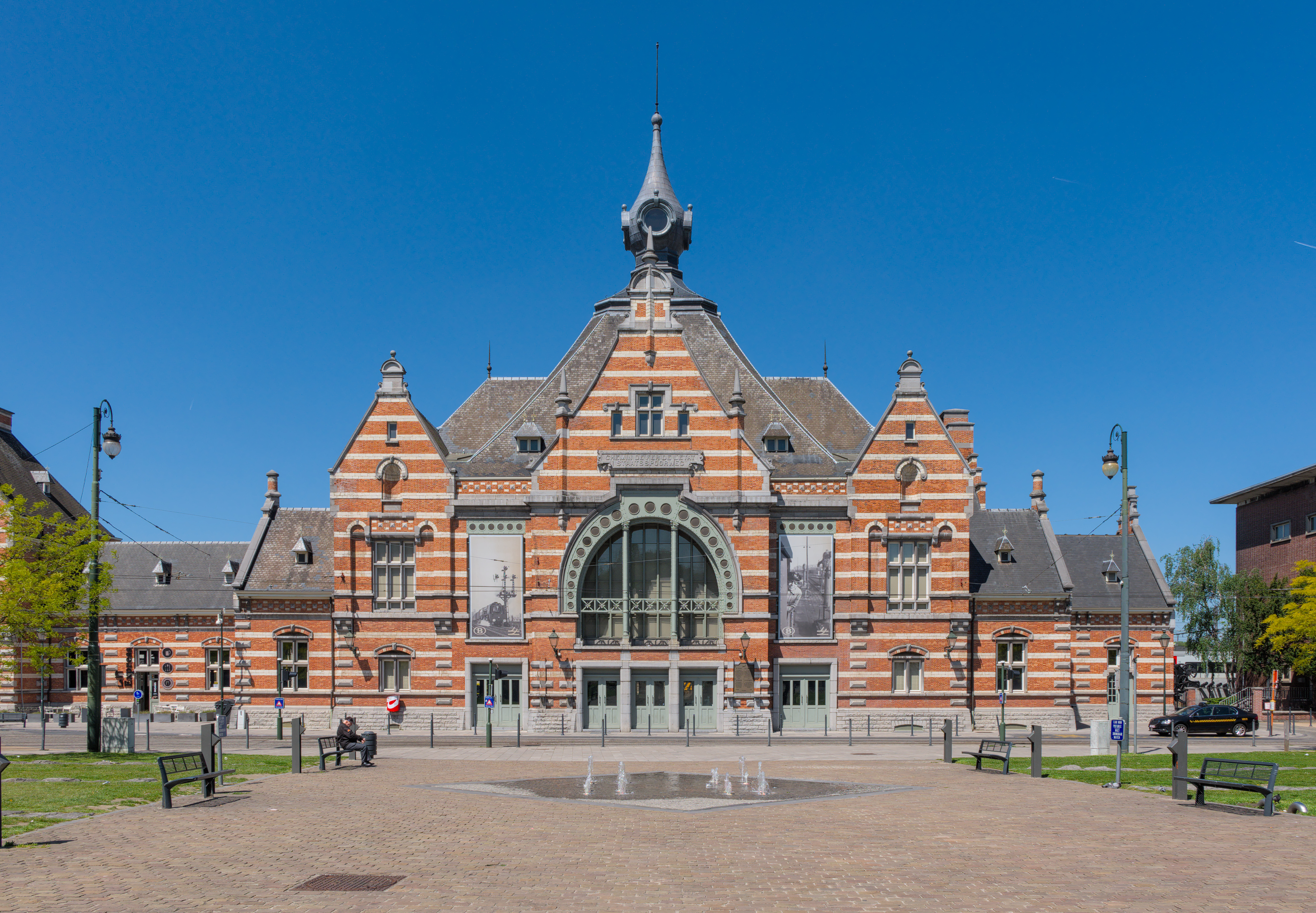
Schaerbeek railway station

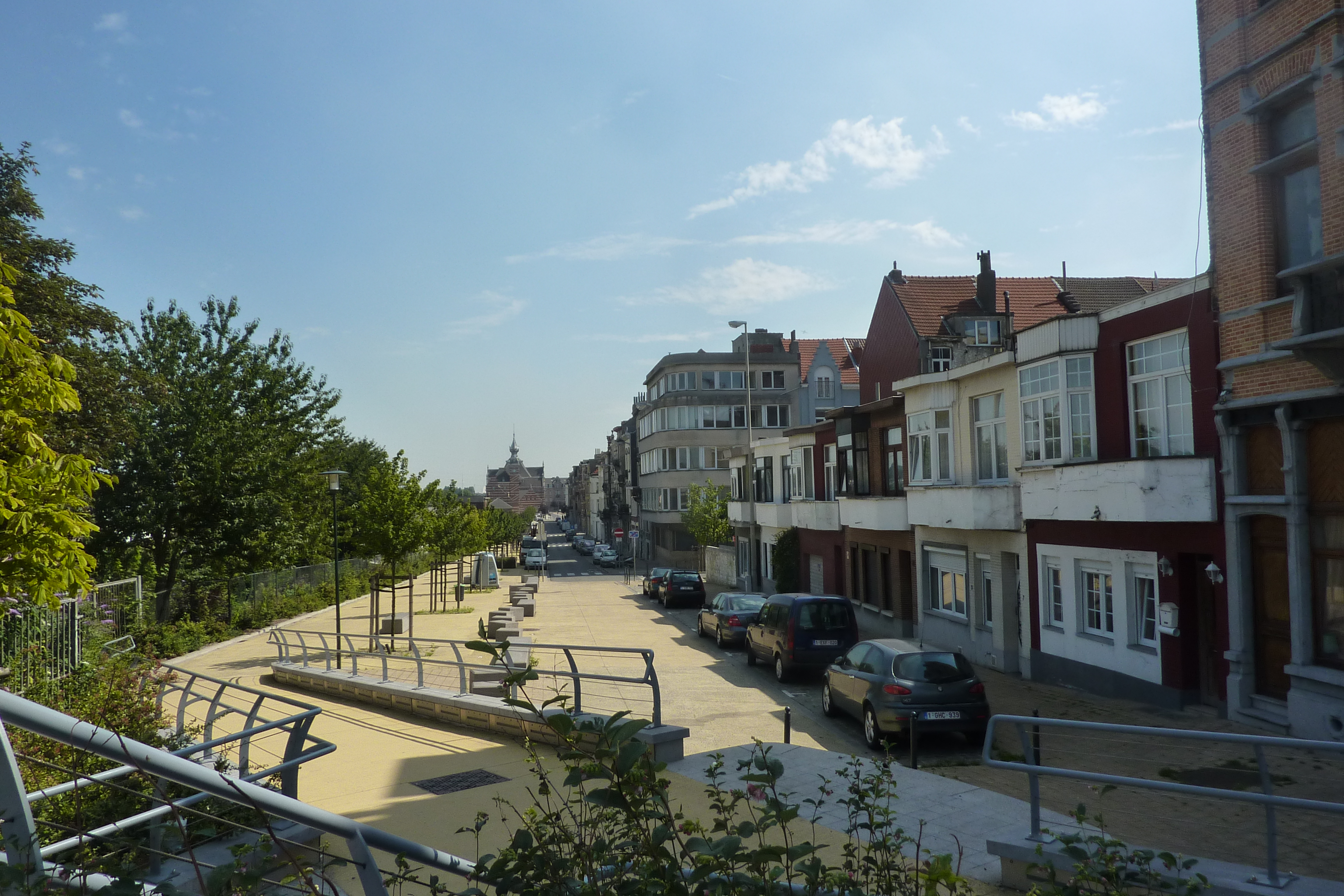
Avenue Monplaisir/Monplaisirlaan

==== Helmet ====
Located in the north of Schaerbeek, on the border with Evere, this district gave its name to the Chaussée de Helmet/Helmetsesteenweg, the Place de Helmet/Helmetseplein and to many places in the surrounding area.

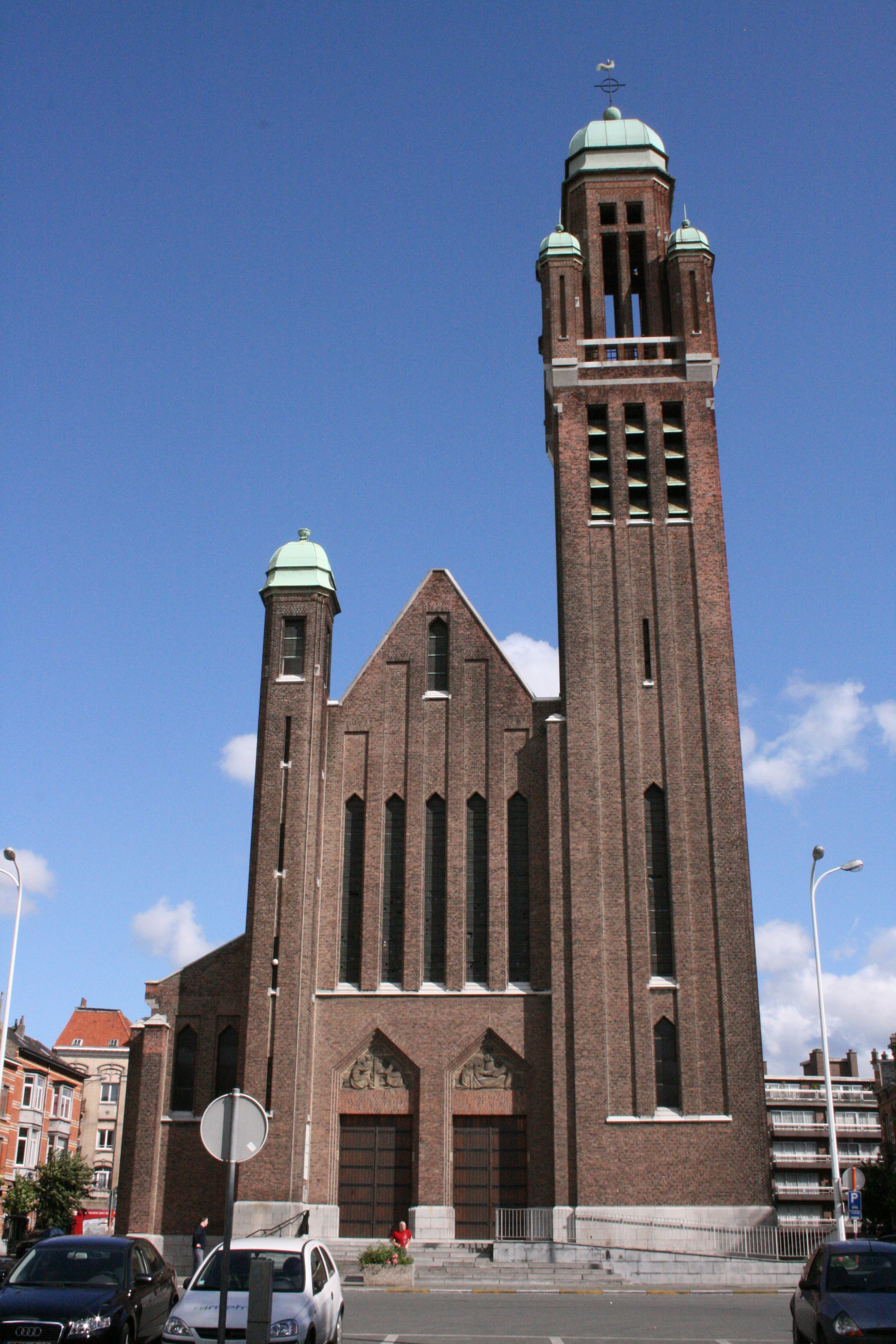
Church of the Holy Family

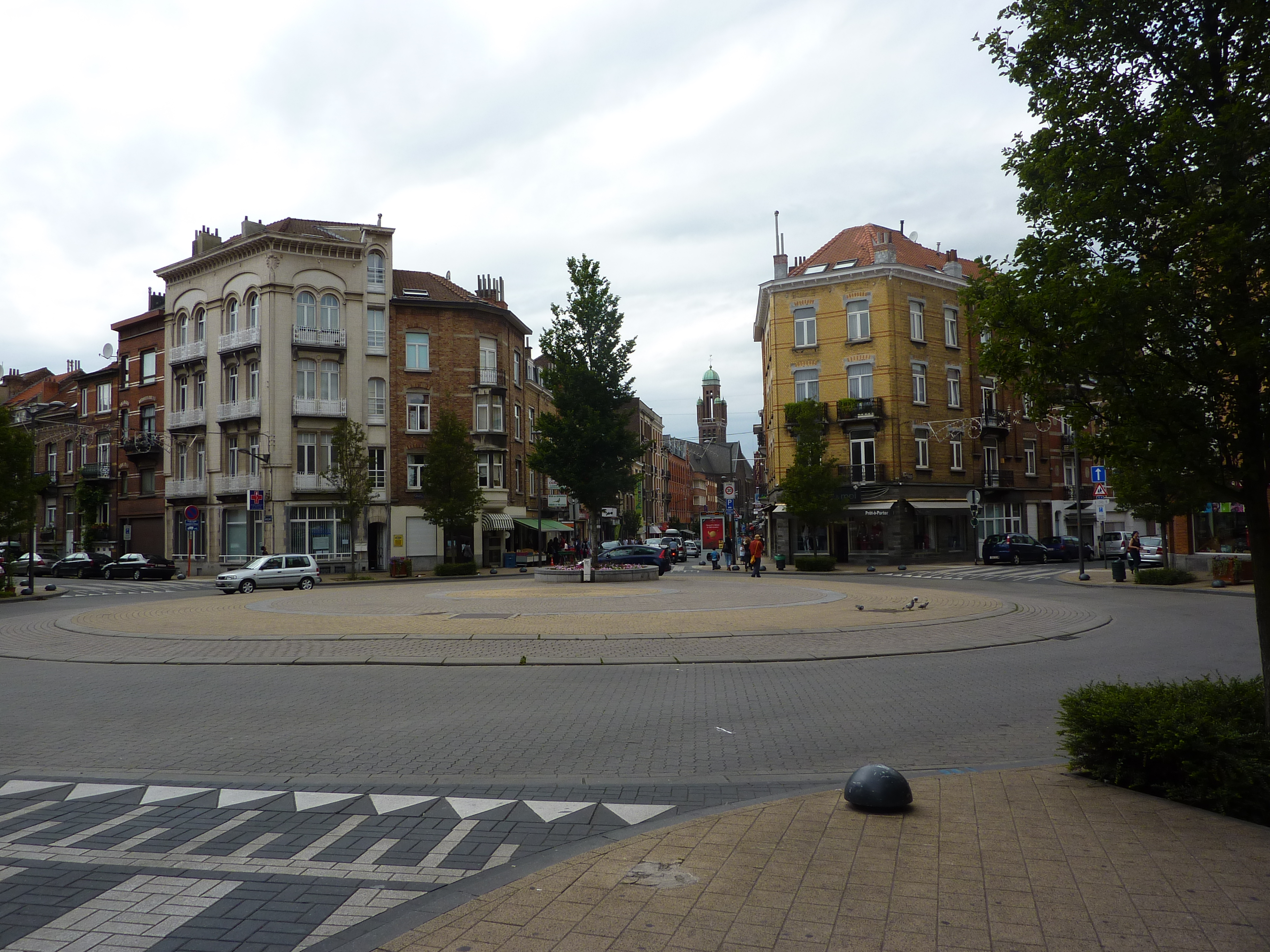
Place de Helmet/Helmetseplein

==== Terdelt ====
Located in the north-east of Schaerbeek, between the Flowers Quarter and Evere, this residential district consists of the Terdelt garden city and the surrounding streets.

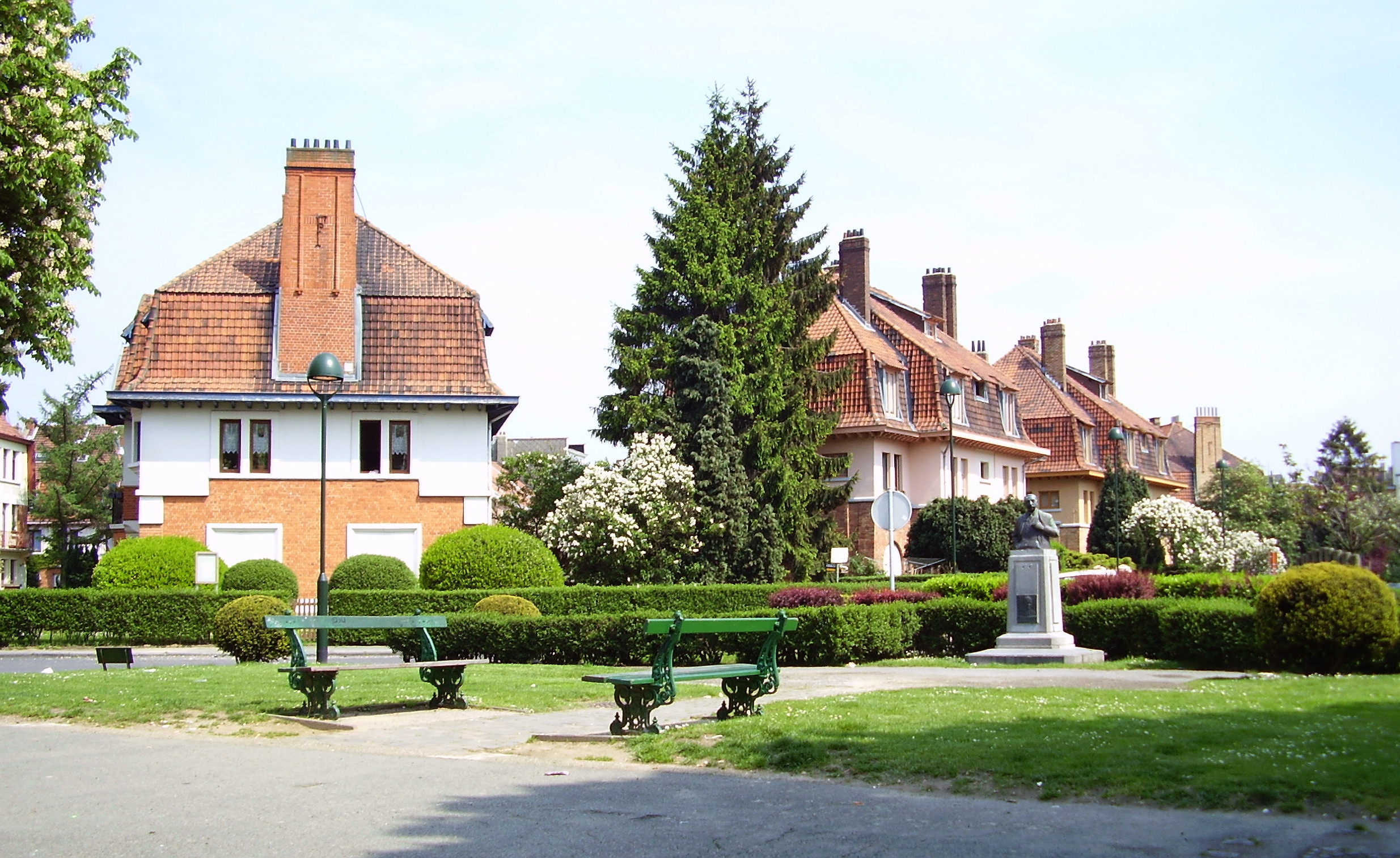
Terdelt garden city

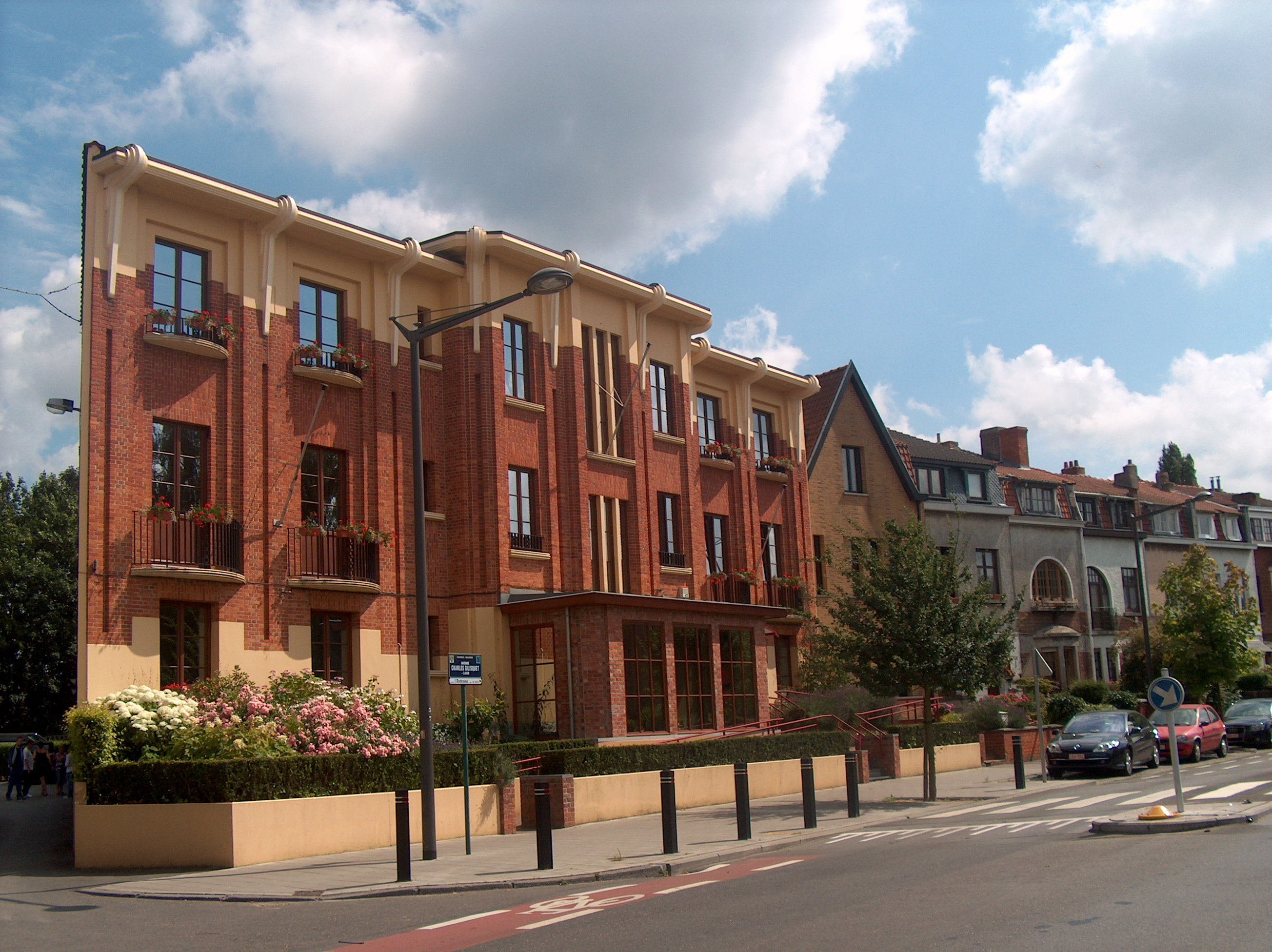
Avenue Charles Gilisquet/Charles Gilisquetlaan

==== Reyers (Mediapark) ====
Located in the south-east of Schaerbeek, on what was originally the site of the National Shooting Range (French: Tir national, Dutch: Nationale Schietbaan), this district is now occupied by a media complex for the Belgian public broadcasters RTBF and VRT.

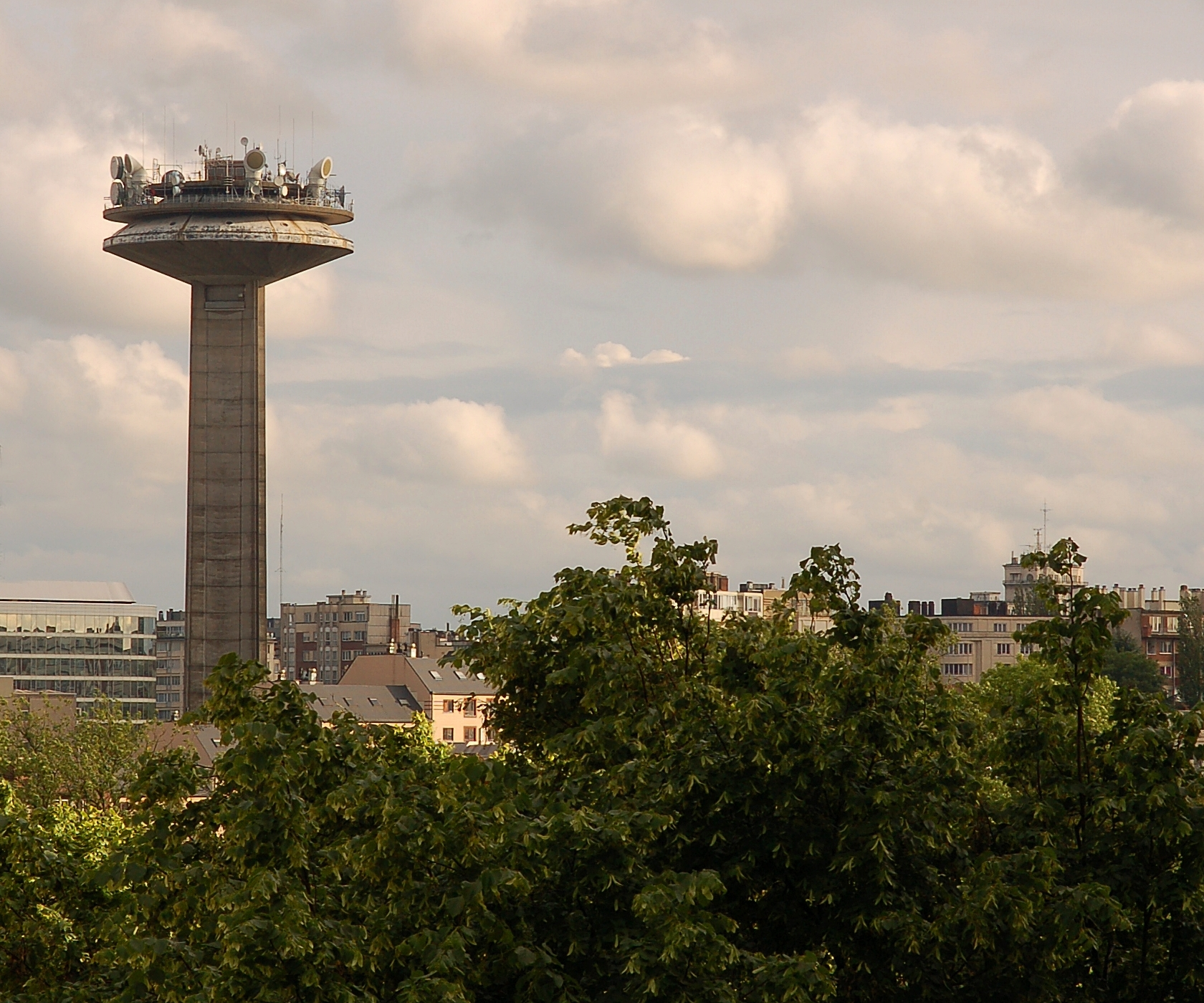
Reyers Tower

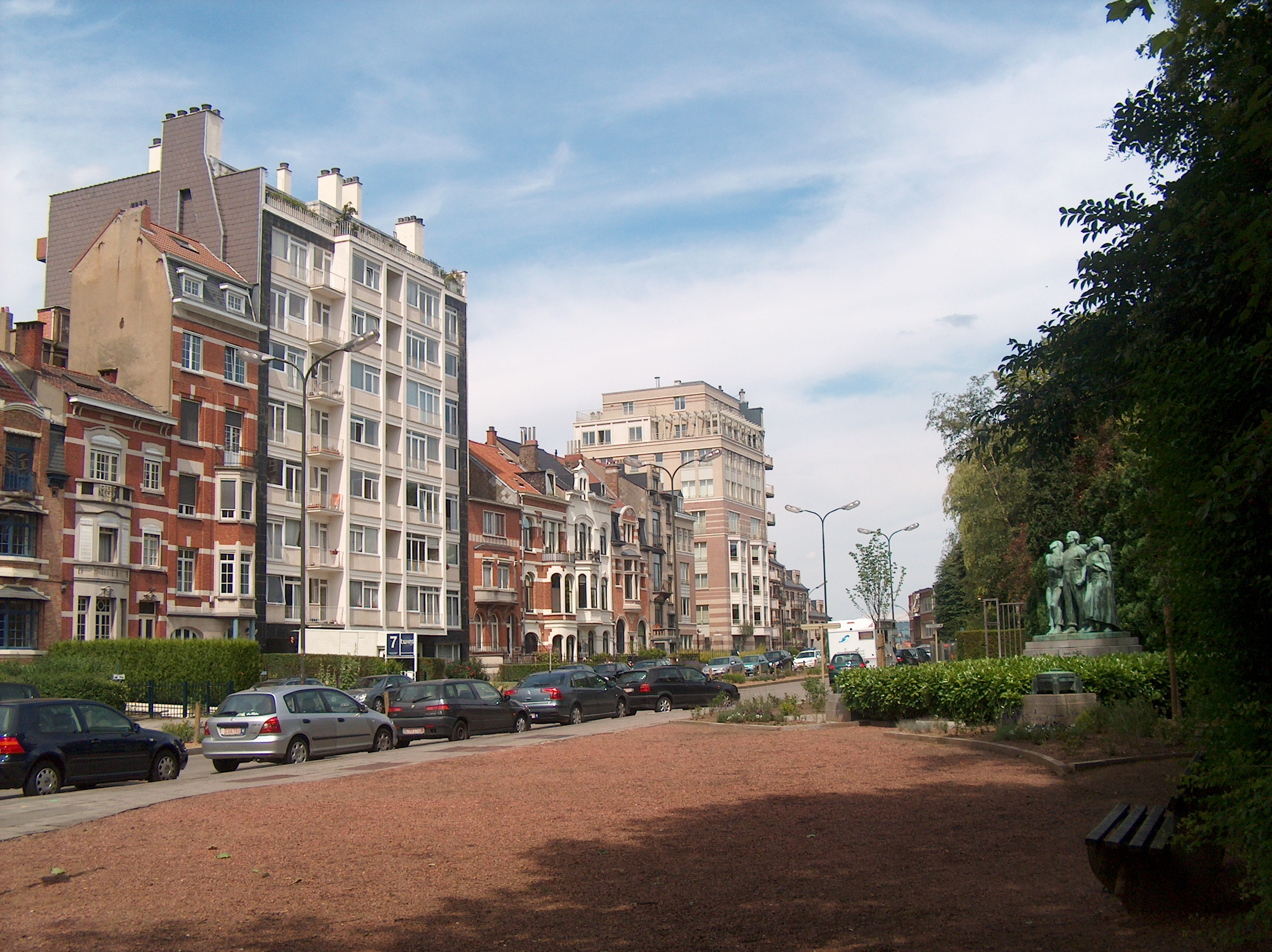
Place des Carabiniers/Karabiniersplein

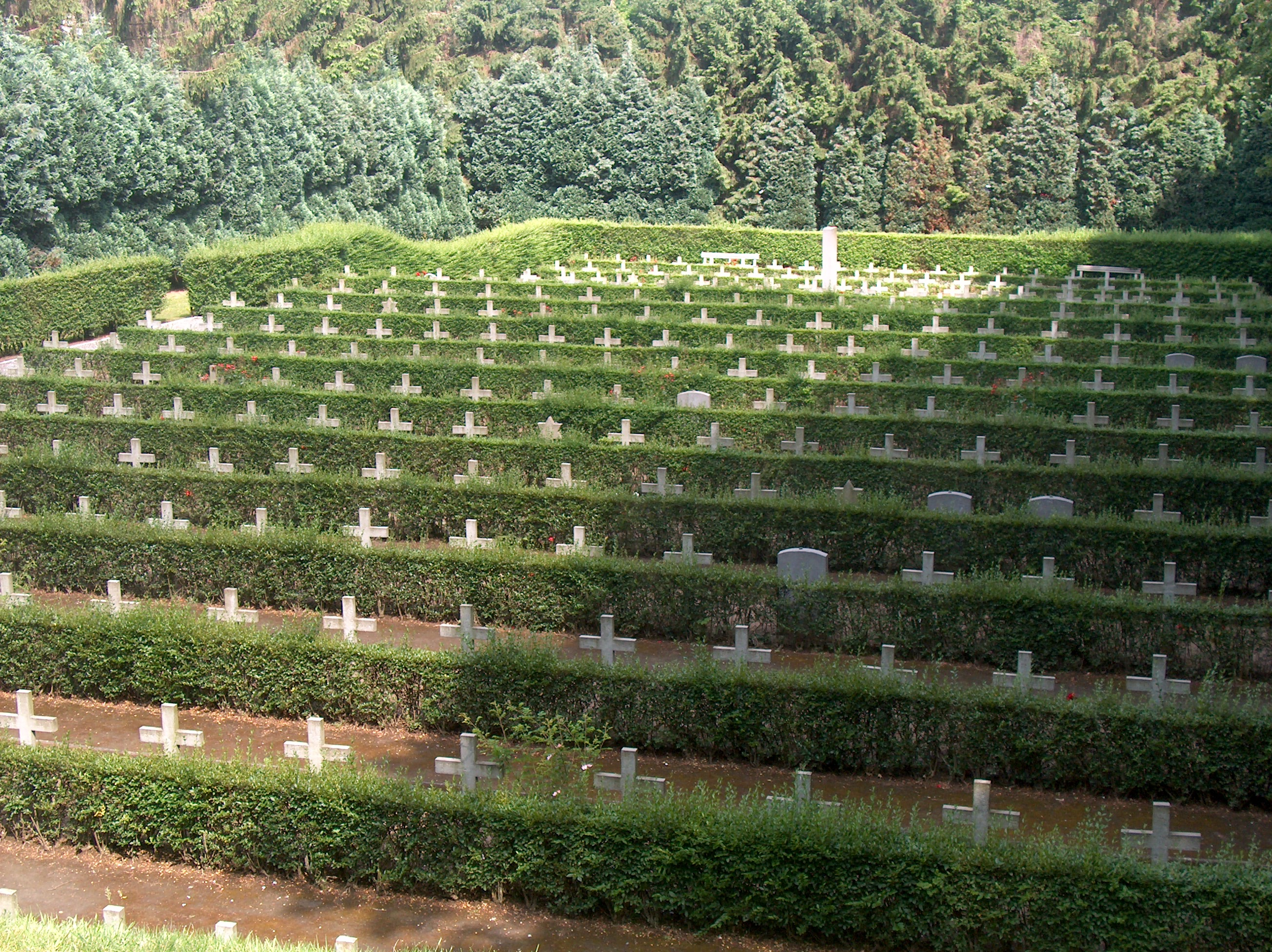
Enclosure of the executed

=== Uccle/Ukkel ===
==== Historical centre ====
The historical centre of Uccle is the municipality's central district. Located near the Chaussée d'Alsemberg/Alsembergsesteenweg, it is a lively area with many small shops. At any time of day, there is a fairly dense crowd of people shopping there. During the week, many schoolchildren from nearby schools pass through. The Municipal Hall of Uccle is located on the Place Jean Vander Elst/Jean Vander Elstplein, in the heart of this district. The Church of St. Peter is also close by, on the Parvis Saint-Pierre/Sint-Pietersvoorplein. Connecting the two is the Rue Xavier de Bue/Xavier de Buestraat, with its succession of luxury boutiques and chain stores.

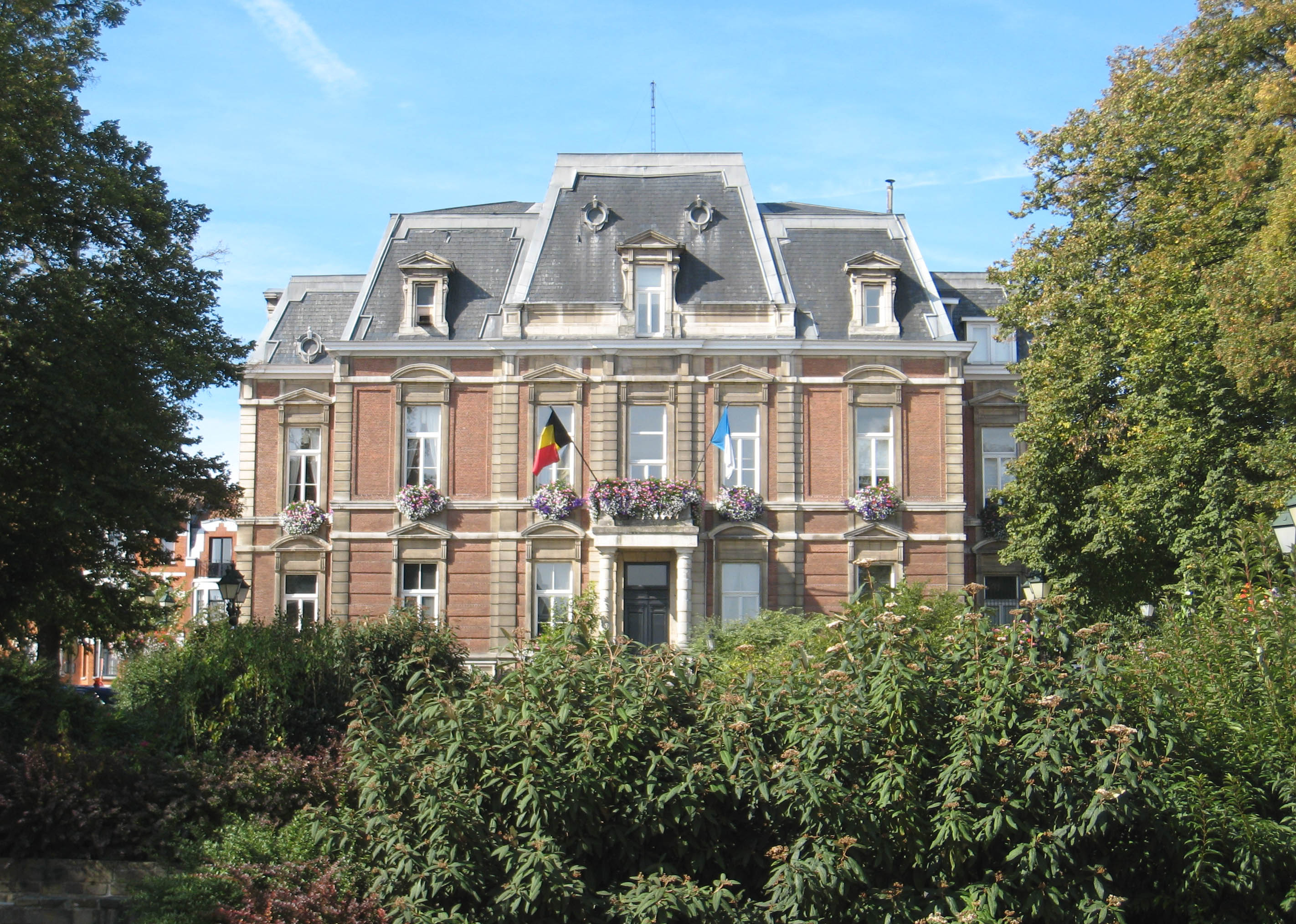
Uccle's Municipal Hall

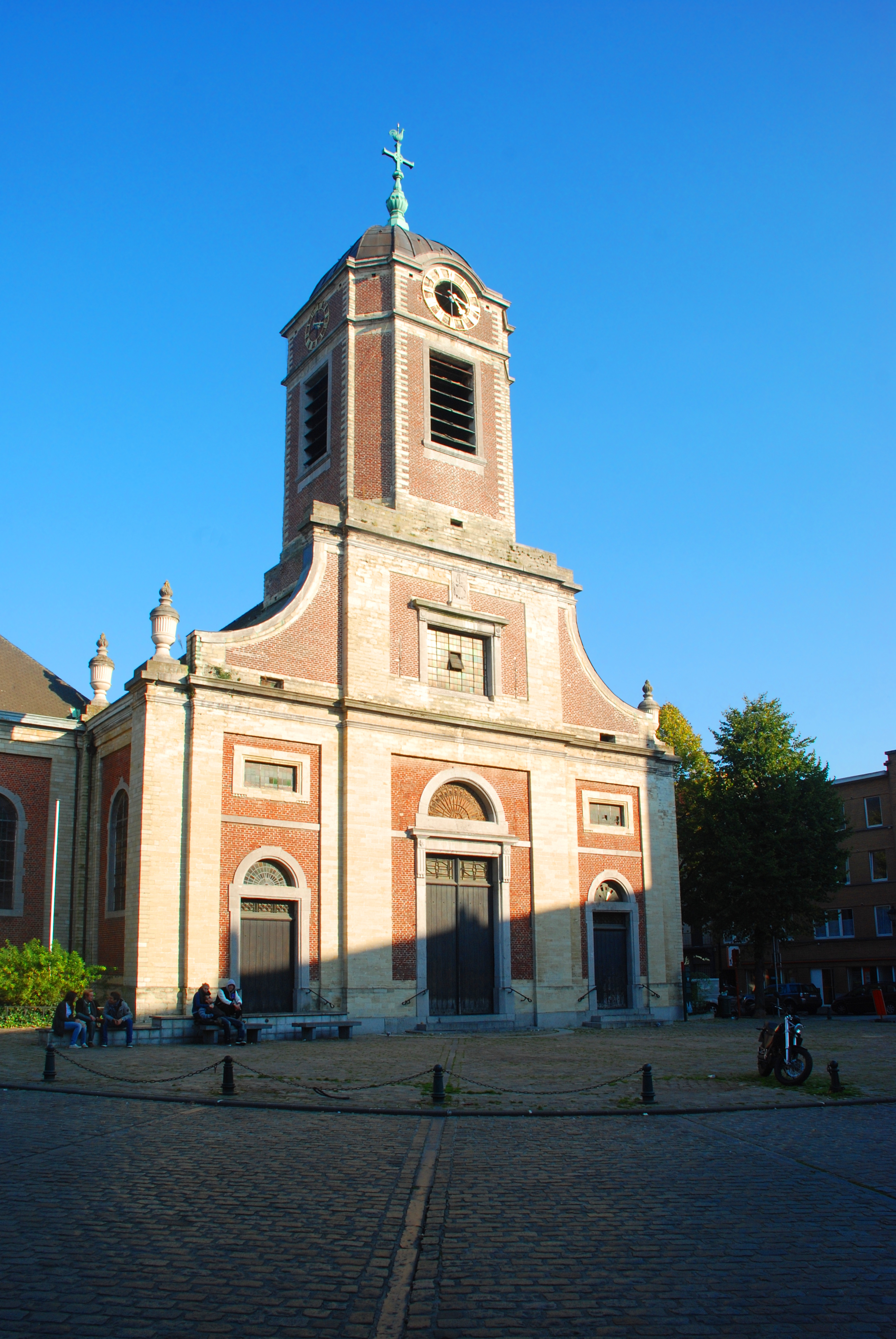
Church of St. Peter

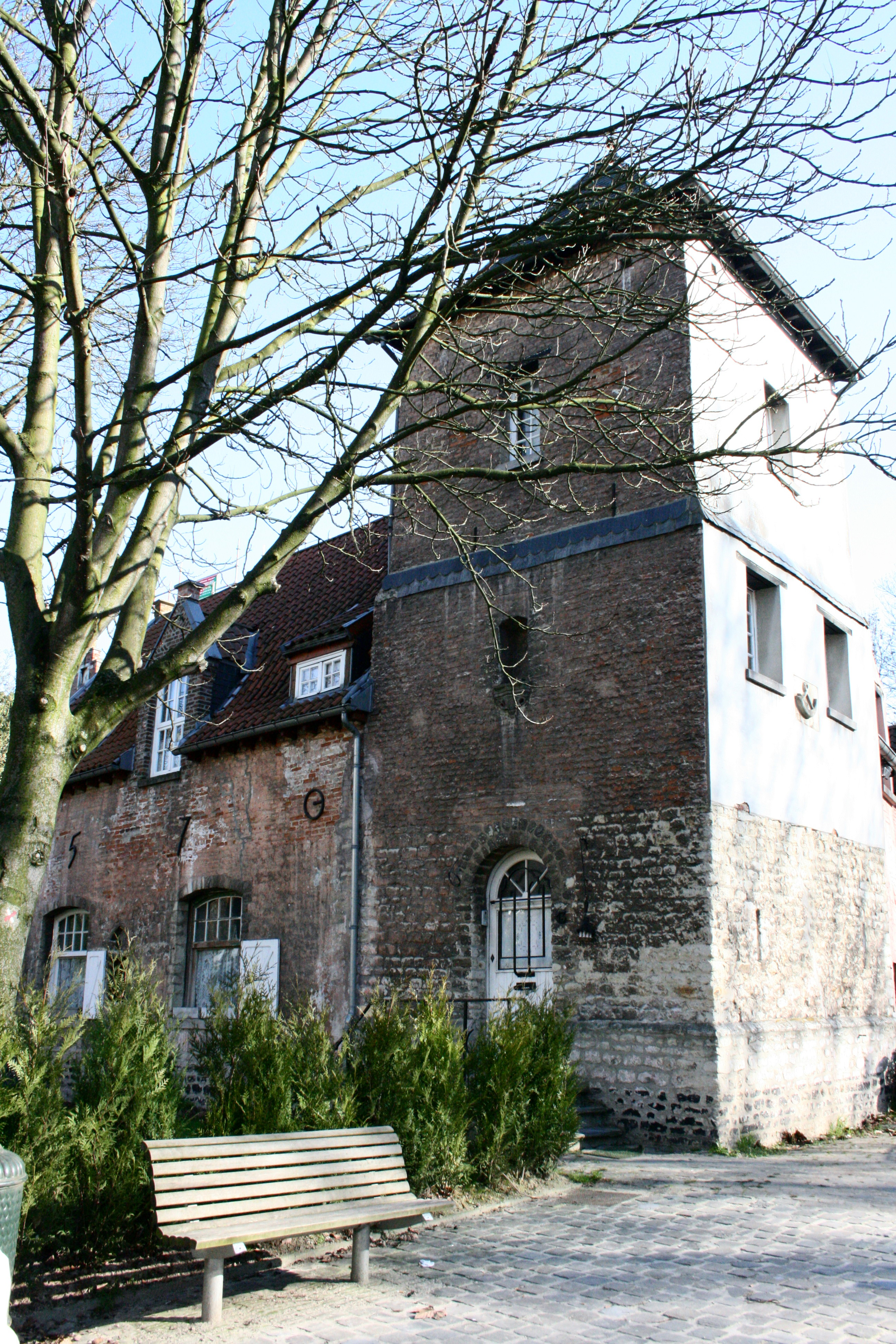
Le Vieux Cornet

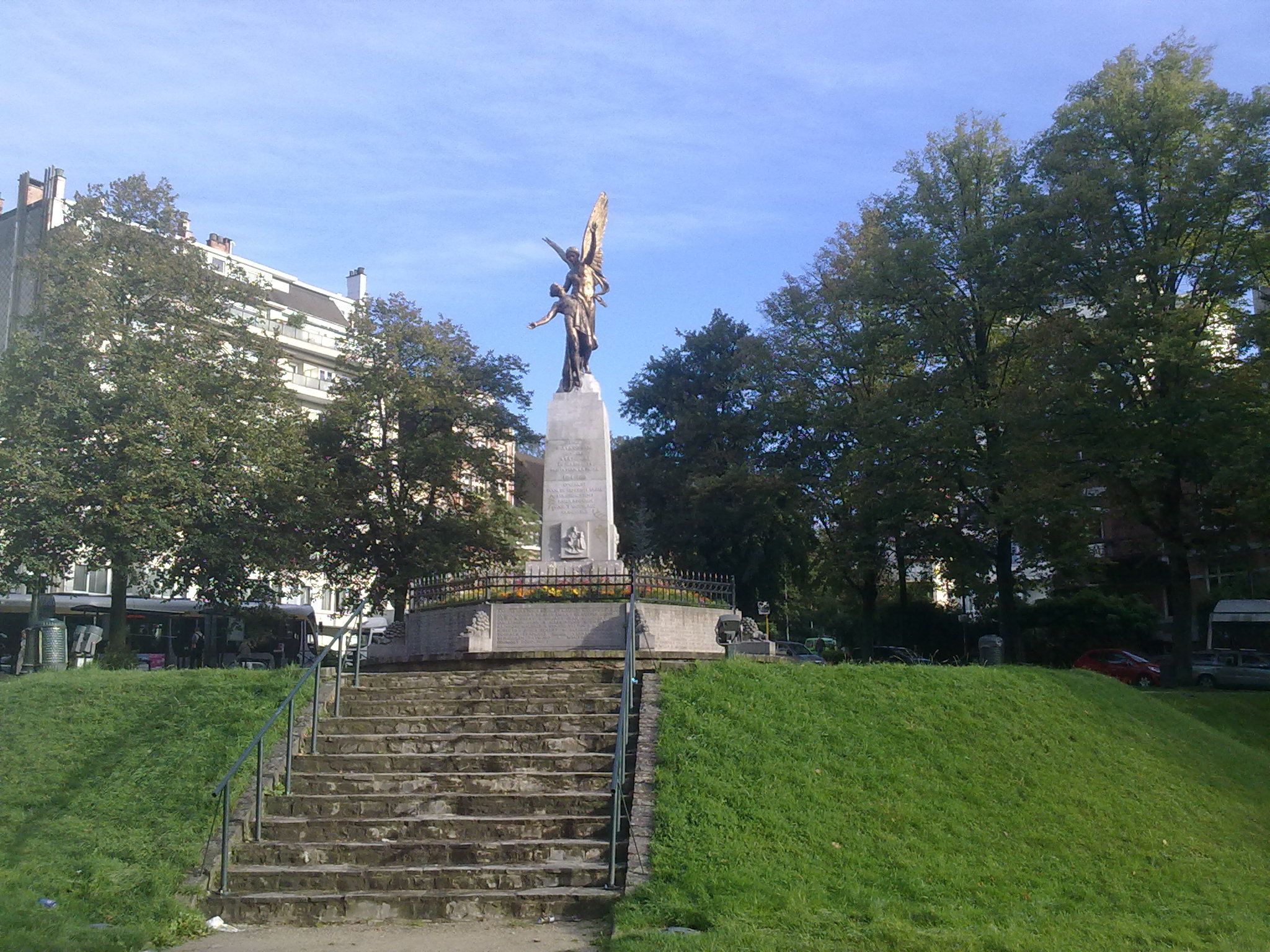
World War I memorial on the Square des Héros/Heldensquare

==== Churchill ====
Located in the north of Uccle, between the Bois de la Cambre/Ter Kamerenbos to the east, the Rue Vanderkindere/Vanderkinderestraat to the north and the Avenue Brugmann/Brugmannlaan to the west, this residential neighbourhood received its name from its main thoroughfare, the Avenue Winston Churchill/Winston Churchilllaan (formerly known as the Avenue Longchamp/Langeveldlaan), itself named after the British statesman and former prime minister Sir Winston Churchill. The area is home to several well-known restaurants such as Brasseries Georges. It is also there that the Van Buuren Museum & Gardens are located (an emblematic example of the Amsterdam School), as well as the Royal Léopold Club tennis and hockey club, commonly known as Le Léo.

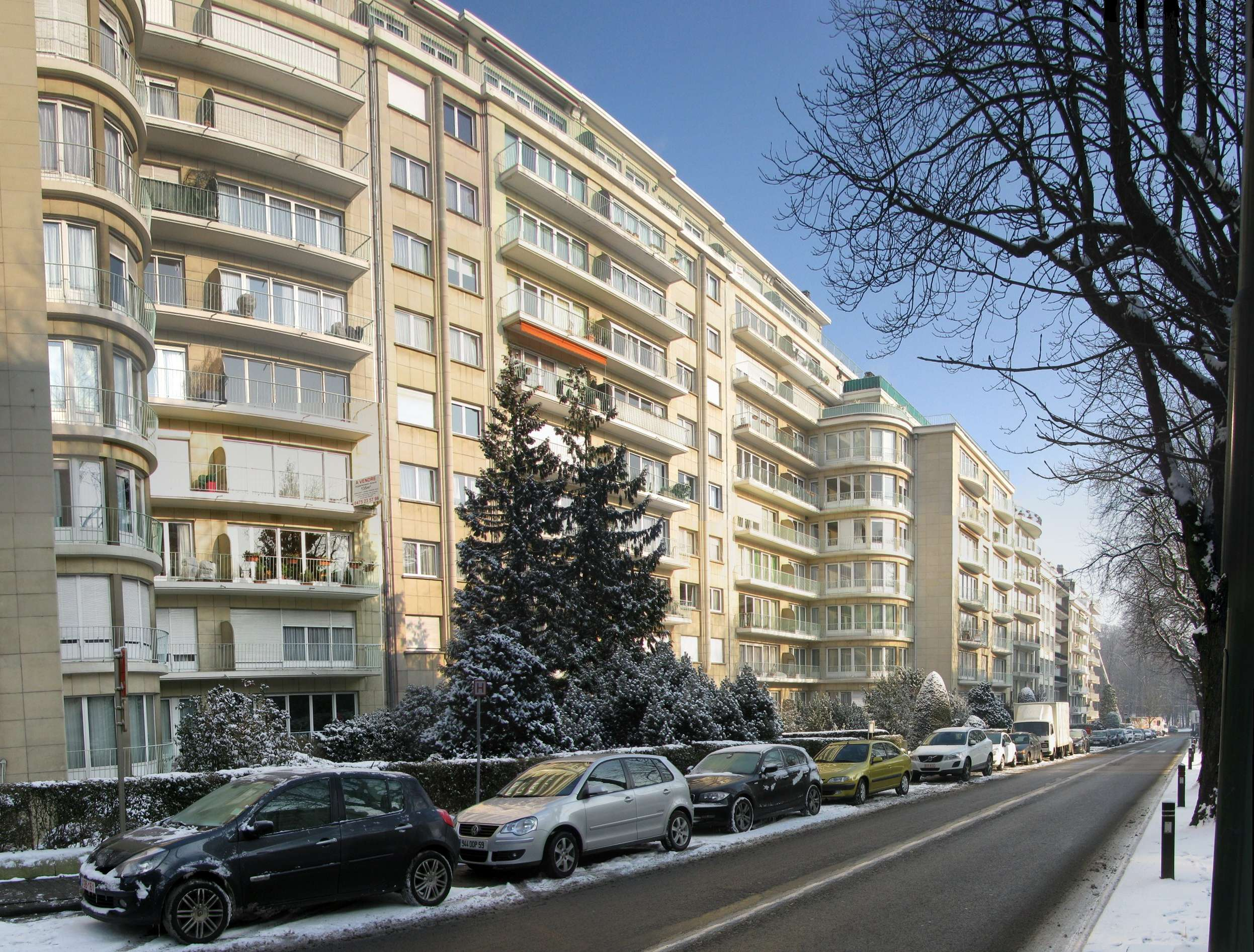
Avenue Winston Churchill/Winston Churchilllaan

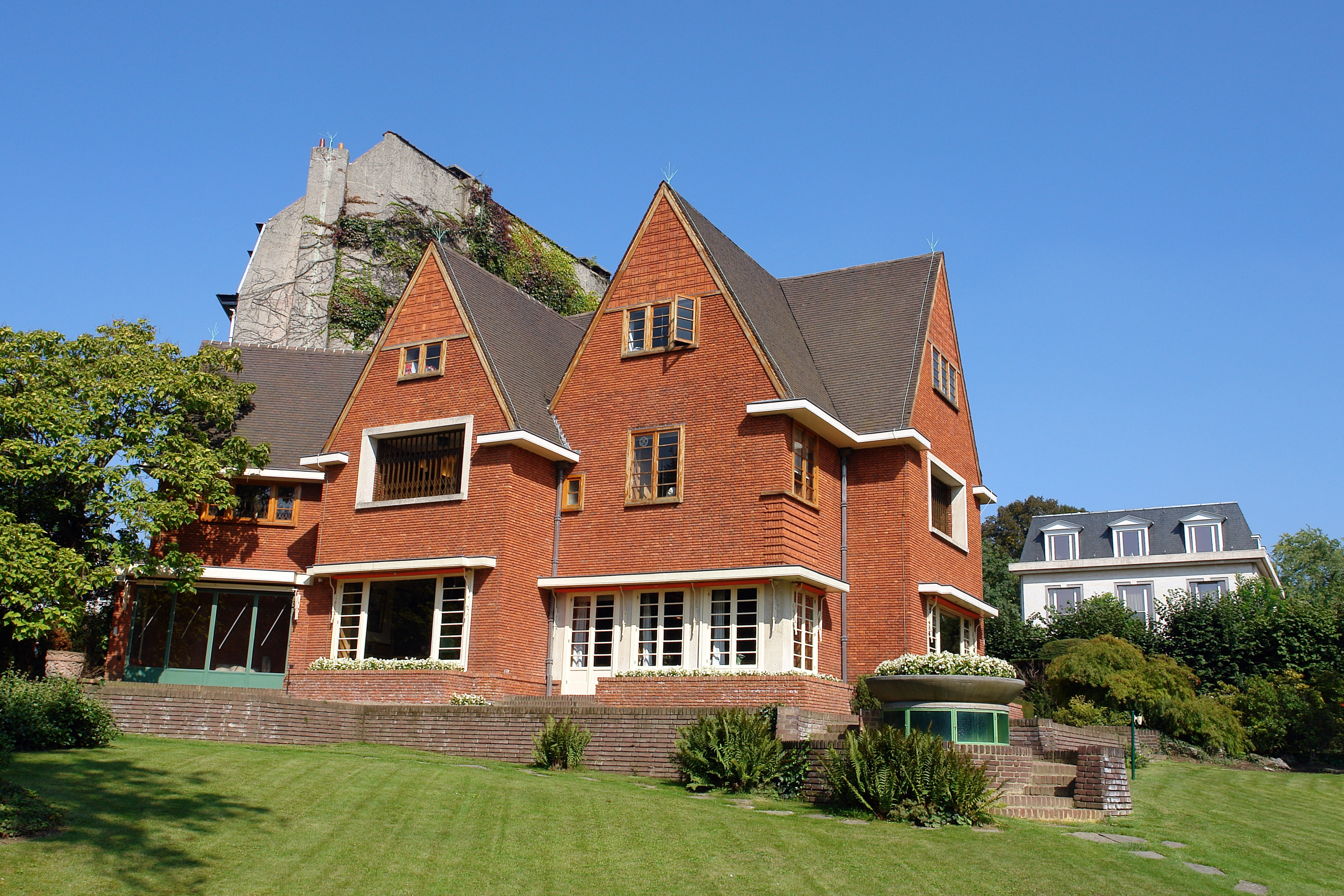
Van Buuren Museum & Gardens

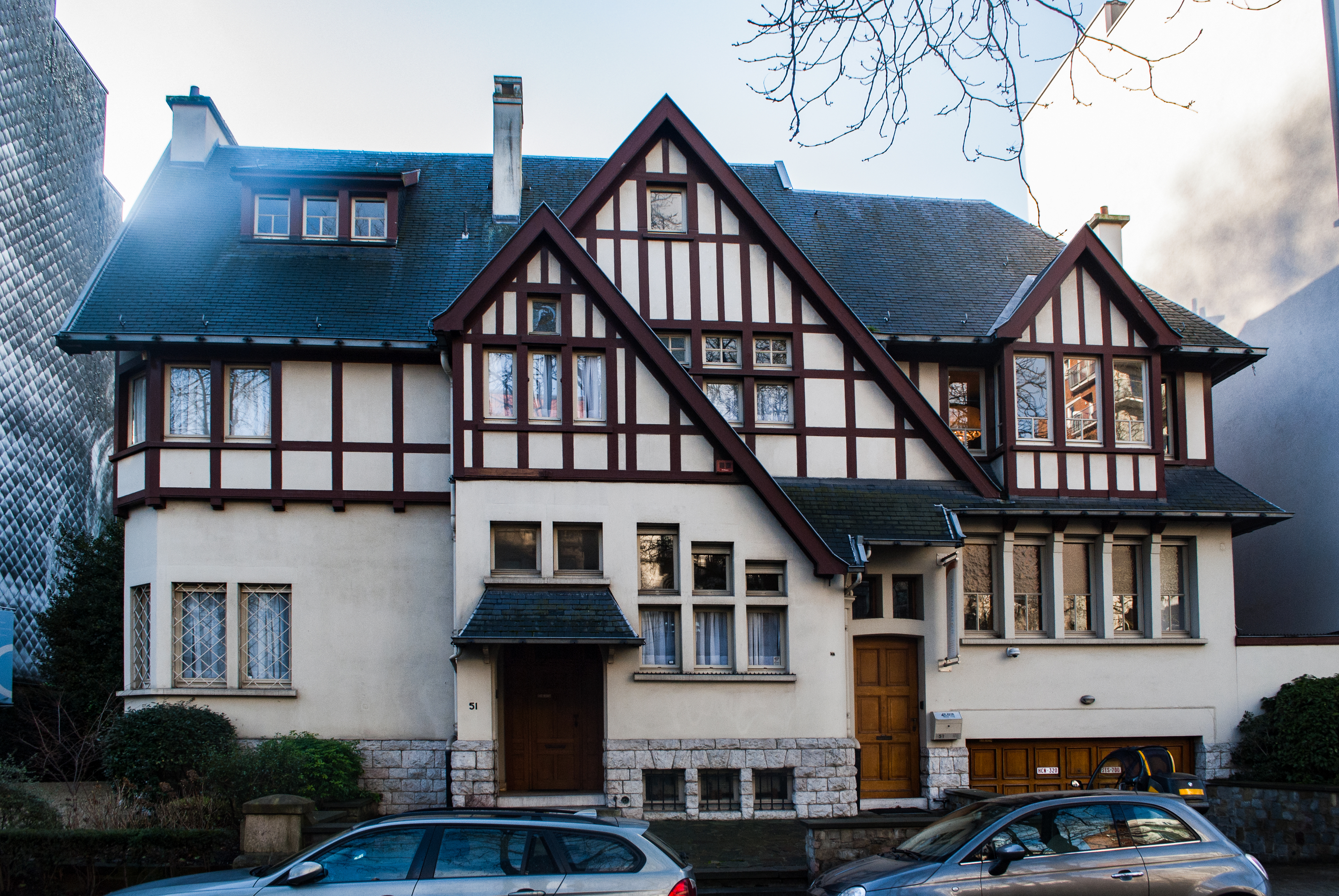
Villa Pelseneer

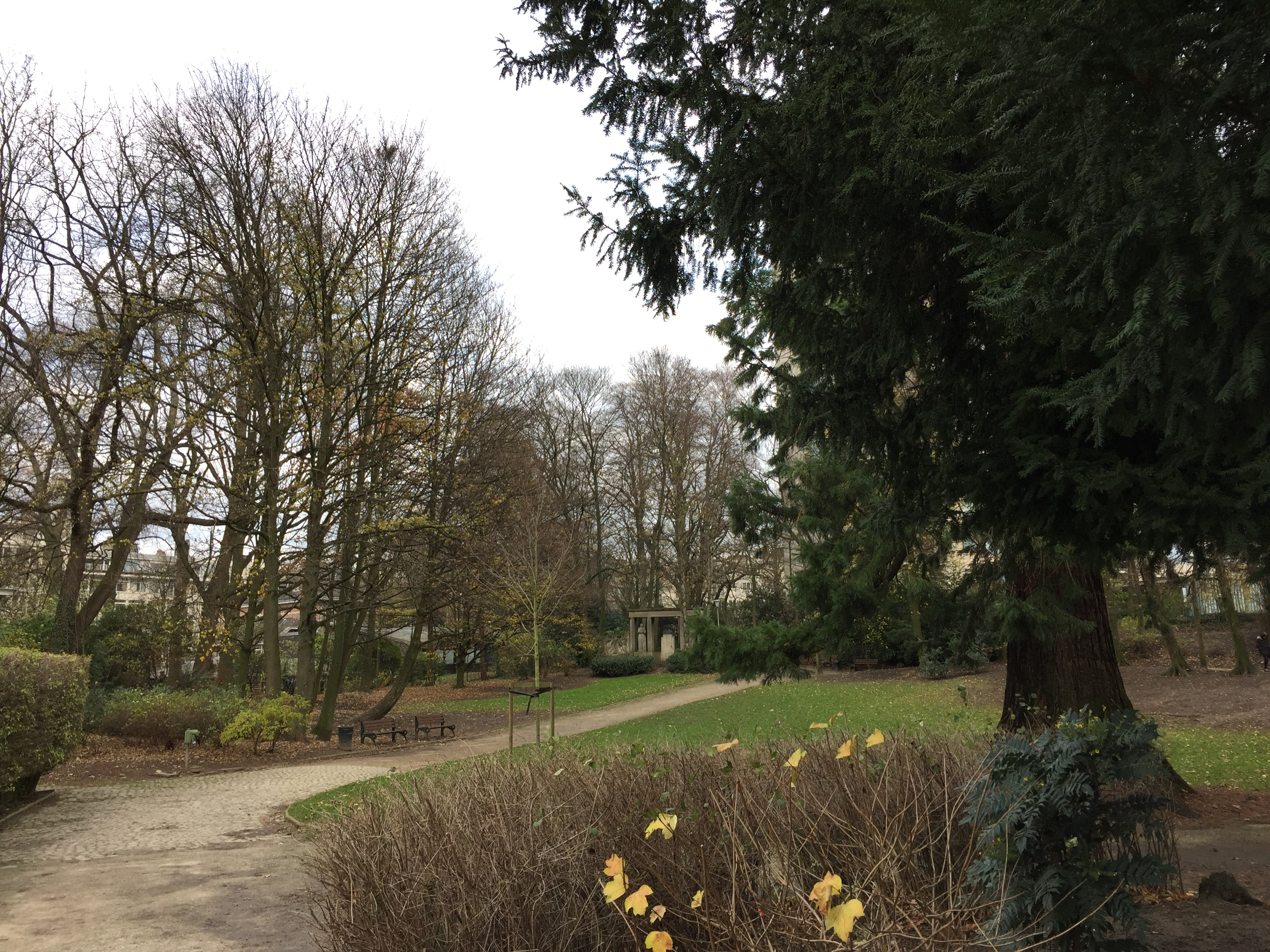
Montjoie Park

==== Vert Chasseur/Groene Jager ====
Located in the north-east of Uccle, this district lies on the edge of the Bois de la Cambre, along the Chaussée de Waterloo/Waterloosesteenweg. The place used to be part of the lordship of Carloo and is said to have been named after the café-restaurant-boarding house Le Vert Chasseur, which existed at the beginning of the 20th century at the current location of the service station at no. 964, chaussée de Waterloo, and was related to the development of the Bois de la Cambre. A residential neighbourhood, it now houses several restaurants including the renowned La Villa Lorraine. In addition, it is home to the Royal Étrier belge equestrian centre and the Royal Brussels Lawn Tennis Club. The European School of Brussels I, the second oldest European school in Europe, is also located there.

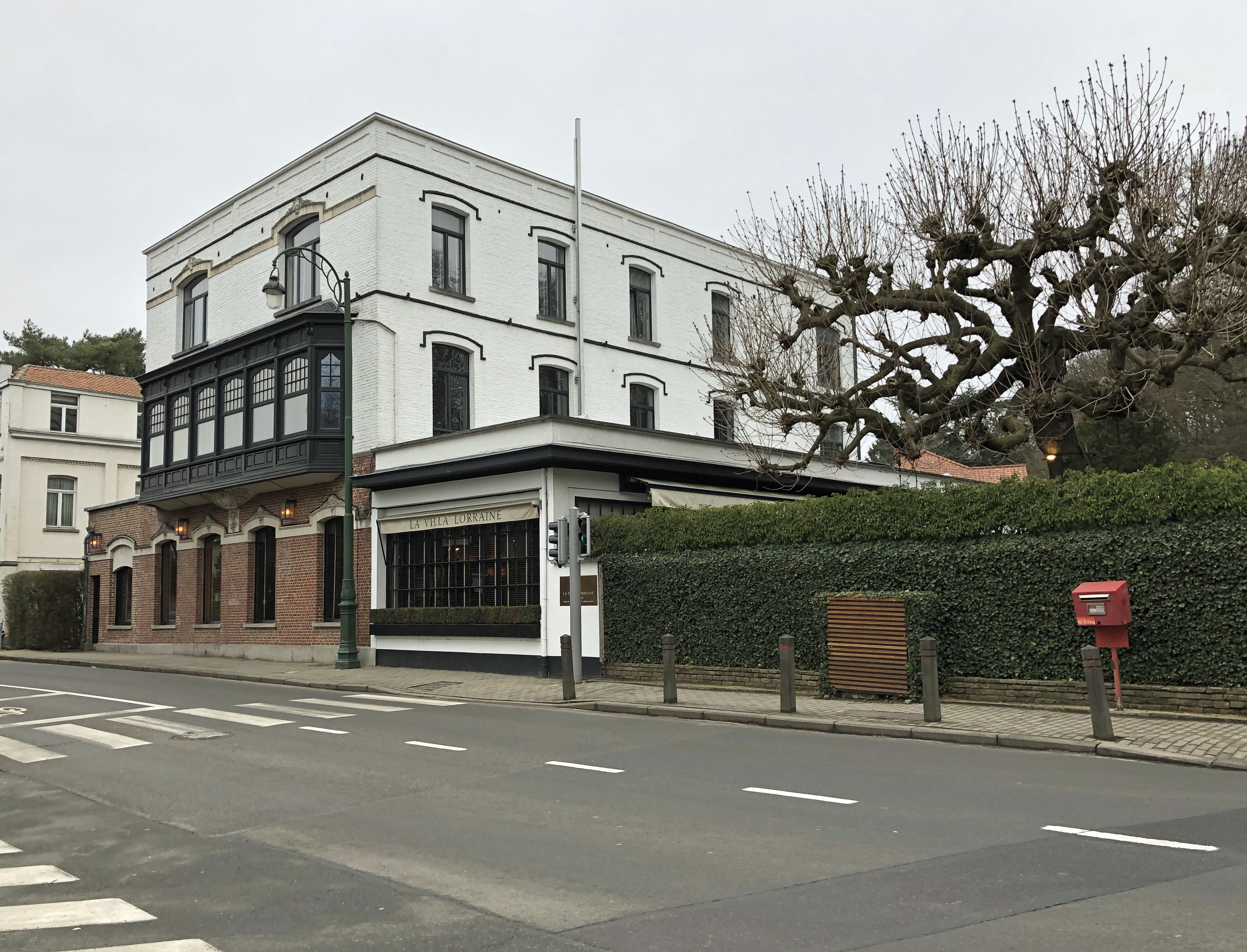
La Villa Lorraine

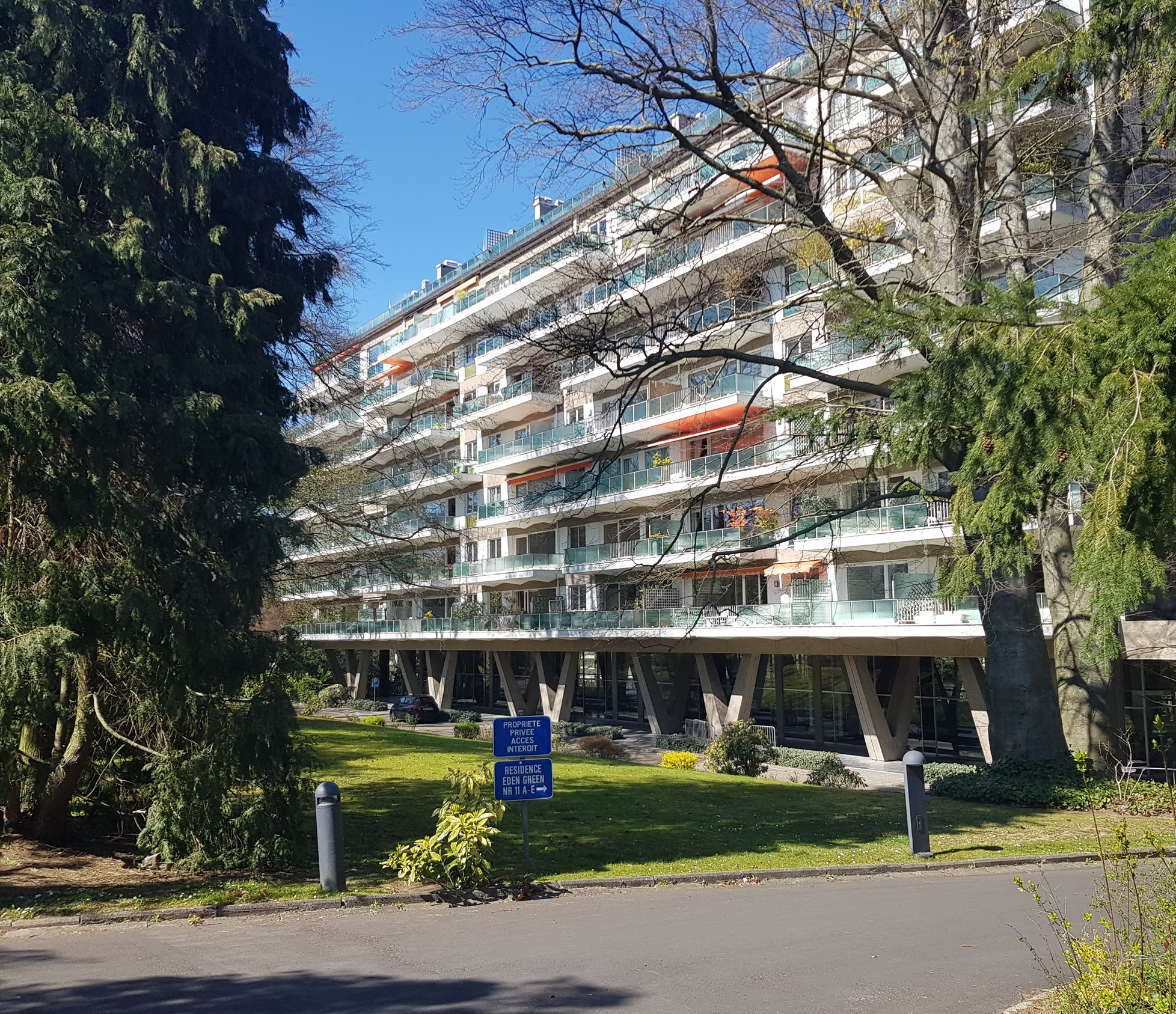
Résidence Eden Green

==== Vivier d'Oie/Diesdelle ====
Located further down the Chaussée de Waterloo, close to where the Bois de la Cambre becomes the Sonian Forest, this residential neighbourhood has the highest average income in the entire region. The Dutch name Diesdelle is a deformation of Dieversdelle, which could be translated as "valley of the inhabitant of the deep place", namely the Geleytsbeek. This was mistaken for Die-vijver, which gave rise to the French name Vivier d'Oie, literally "Goose Pond". The listed Stade du Vivier d'Oie was built in 1902 for the then top football club Racing Club de Bruxelles, which played there until after the Second World War.

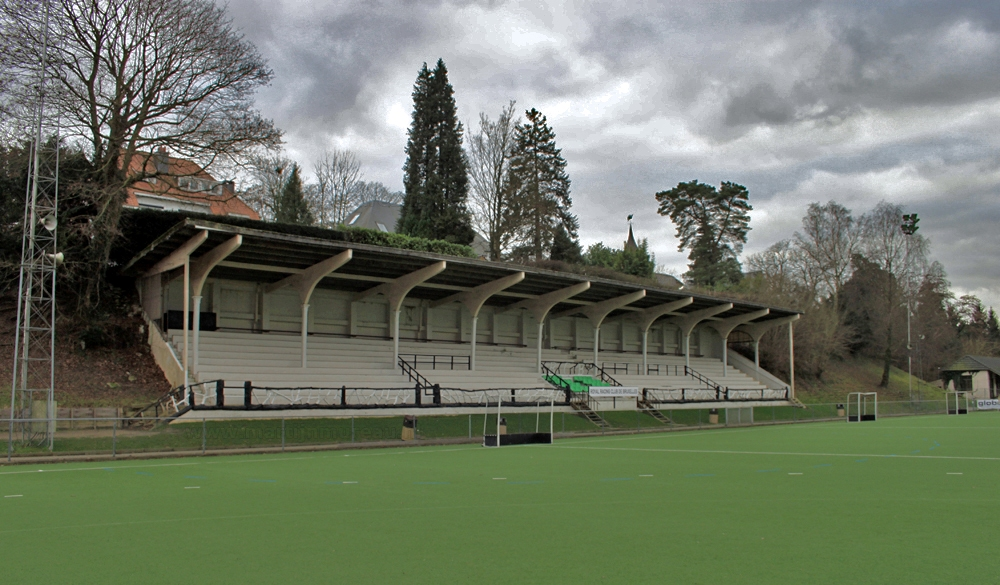
Stade du Vivier d'Oie

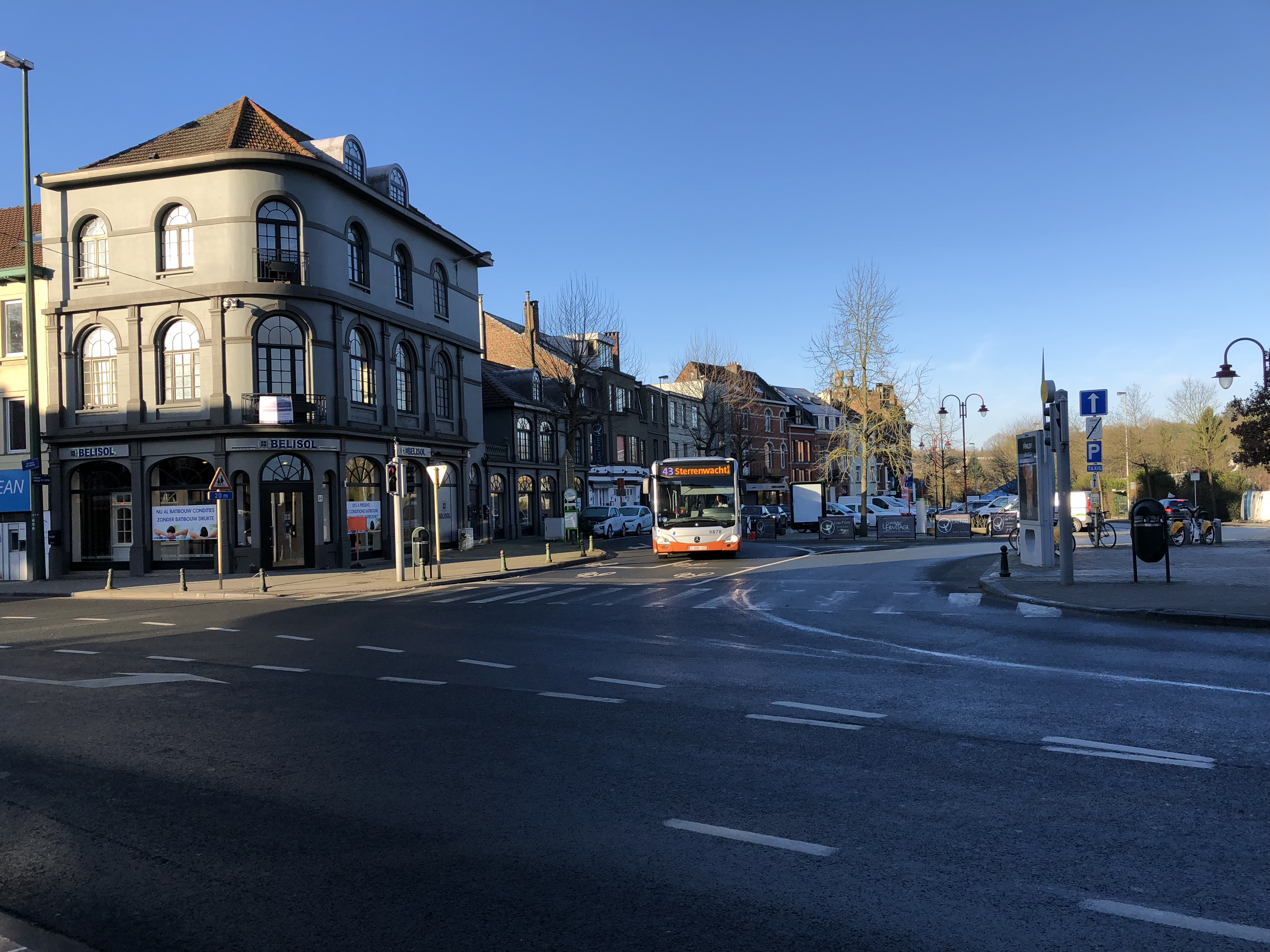
Avenue du Prince de Ligne/Prins de Lignelaan

==== Saint-Job/Sint-Job ====
Located to the west of Vivier d'Oie, the Saint-Job/Sint-Job district is centred around the Place de Saint-Job/Sint-Jobsplein, where a multitude of small shops are clustered. The neighbourhood retains the characteristics of the small village it once was, with paths leading from the square to green spaces and meadows like the Avijl Plateau. The neo-Gothic Church of St. Job is the work of the Antwerp architects Jules Bilmeyer and Van Riel.

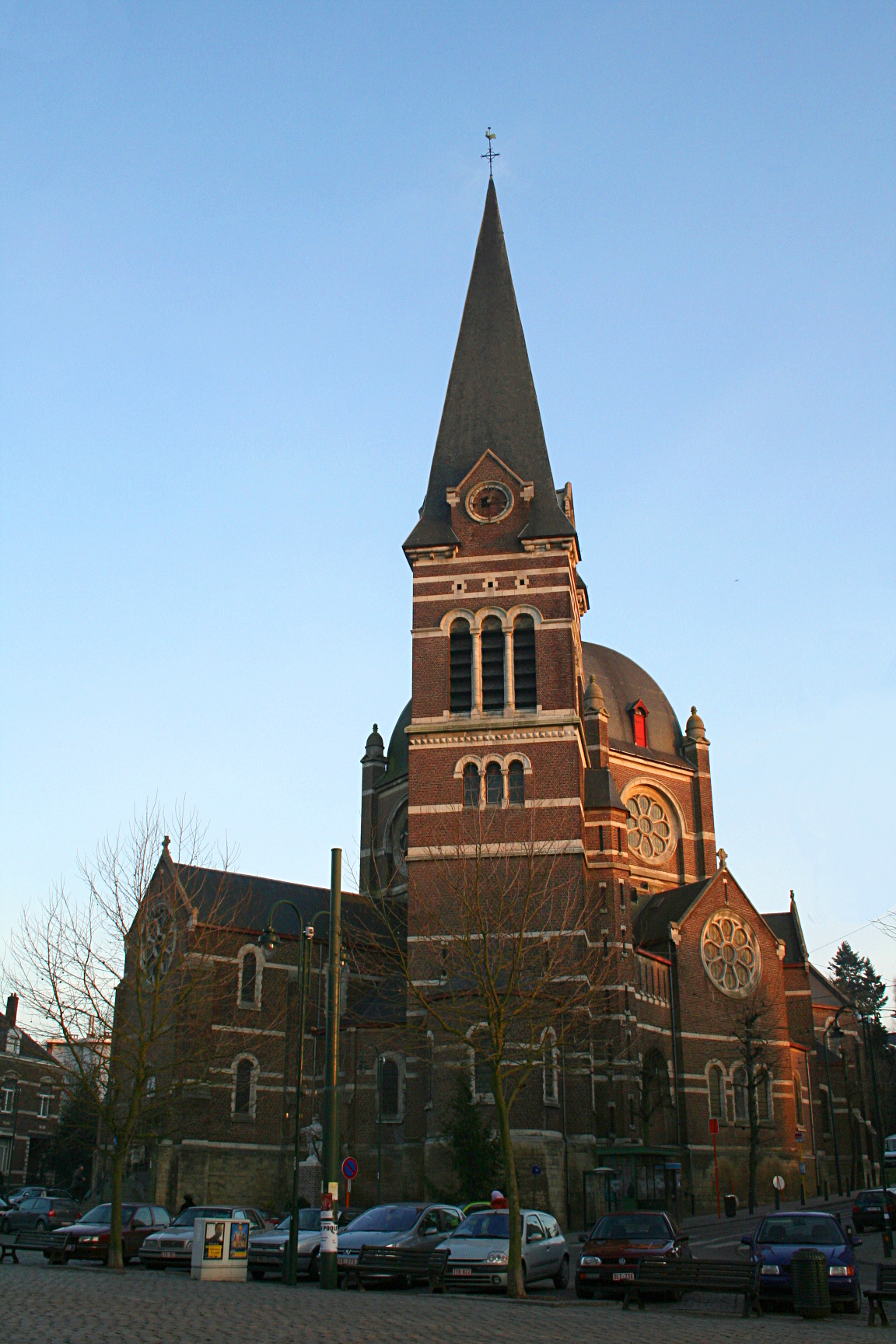
Church of St. Job

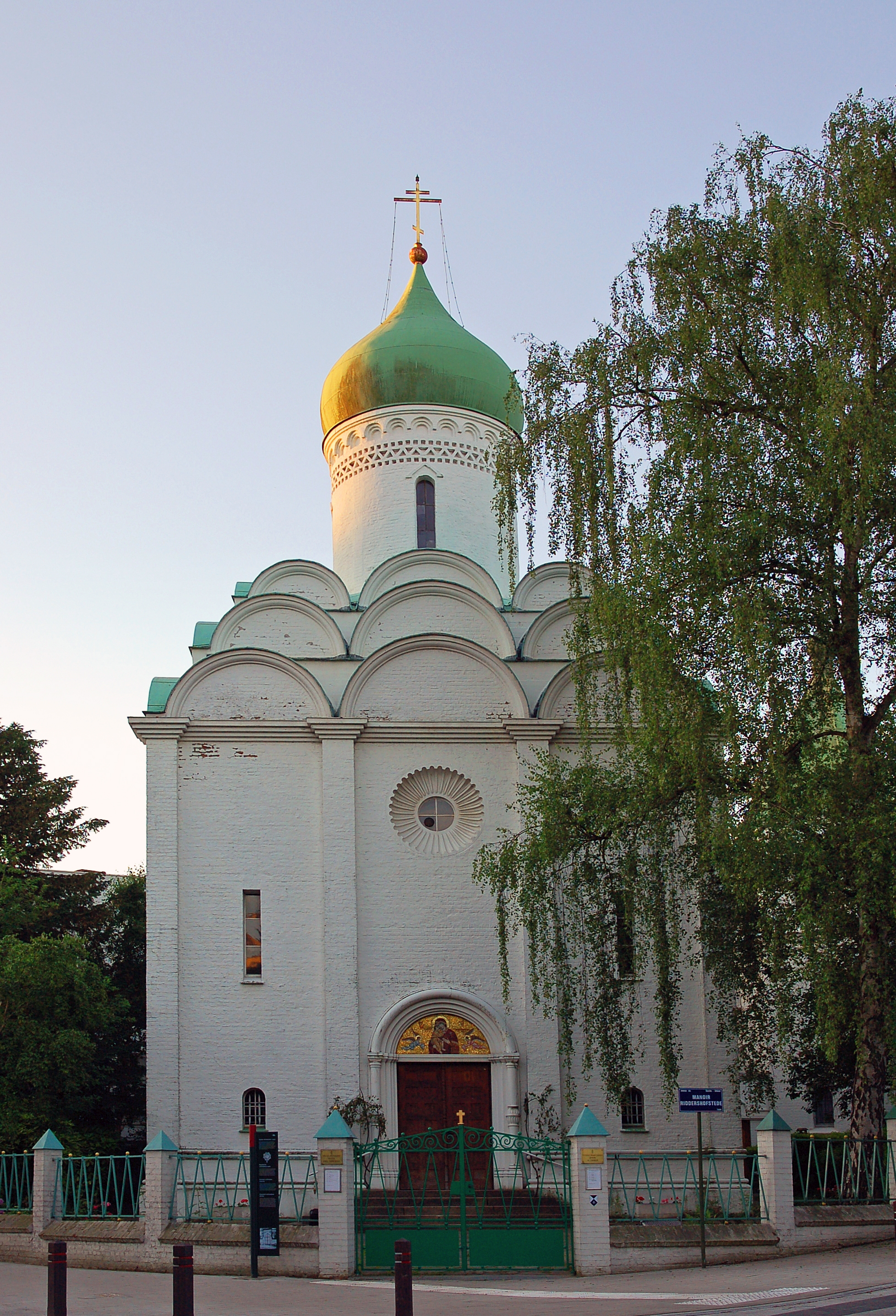
Russian Orthodox Church of Saint-Job

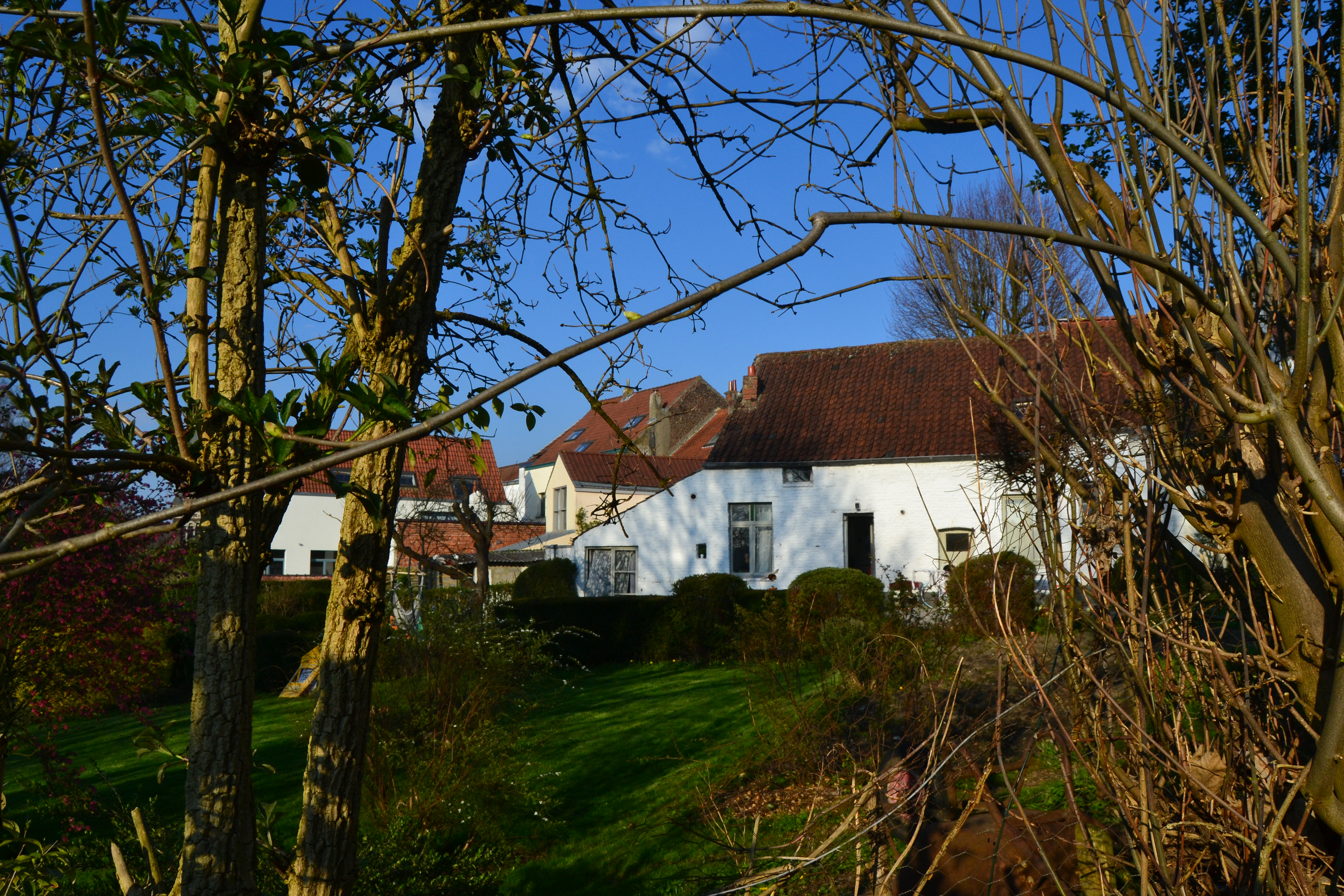
Typical house on the Avijl Plateau

==== Fort Jaco ====
Located in the east of Uccle, this district is named after the former Fort Jaco, itself named in honour of Jacques Pastur. An affluent neighbourhood, it is home to many shops. Its proximity to the Prince of Orange district and the Place de Saint-Job makes the immediate surroundings of the Chaussée de Waterloo very lively and congested during the week and on Saturdays. However, once rush hour has passed, the neighbourhood becomes tranquil again.

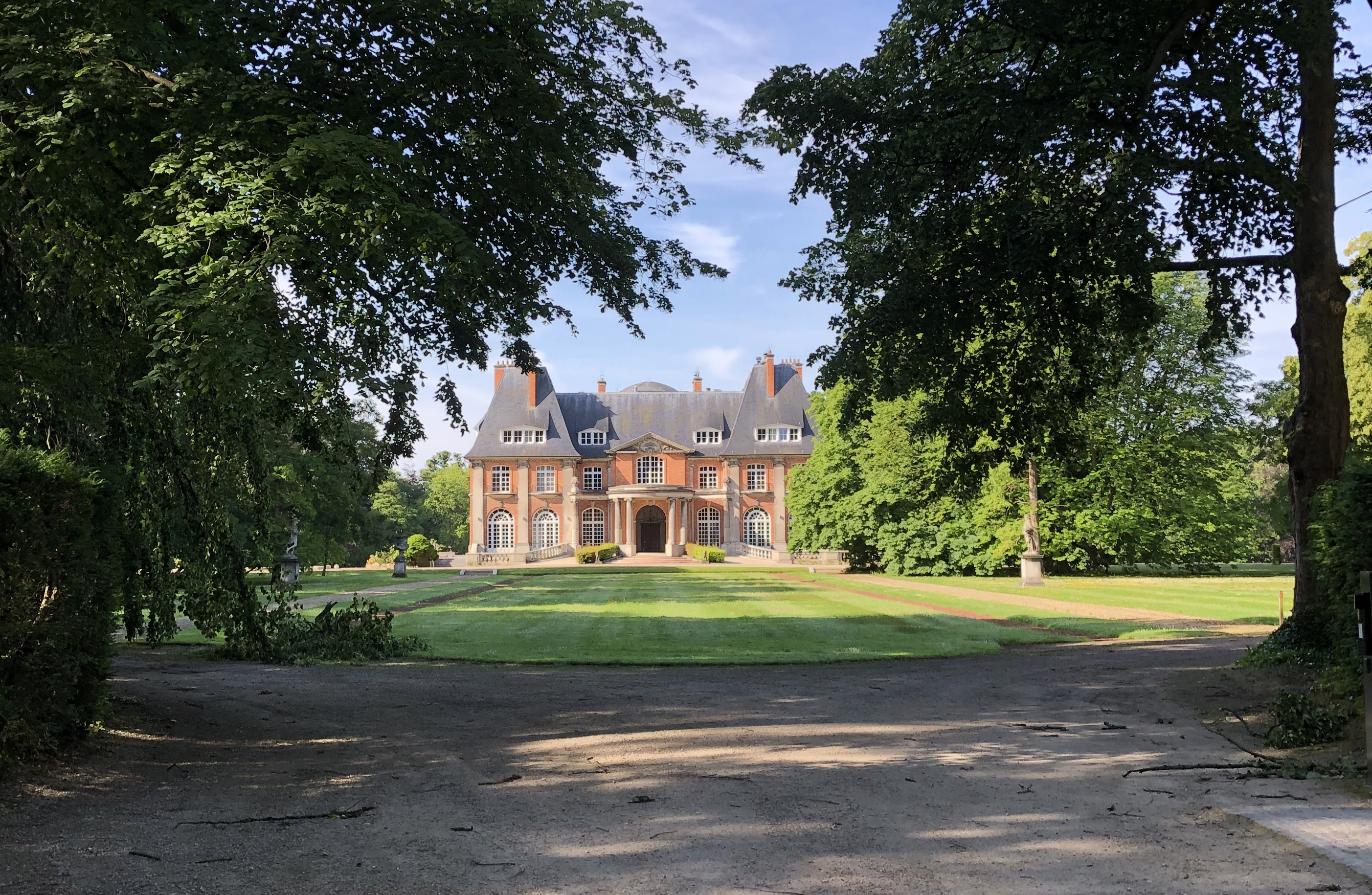
Château de La Fougeraie

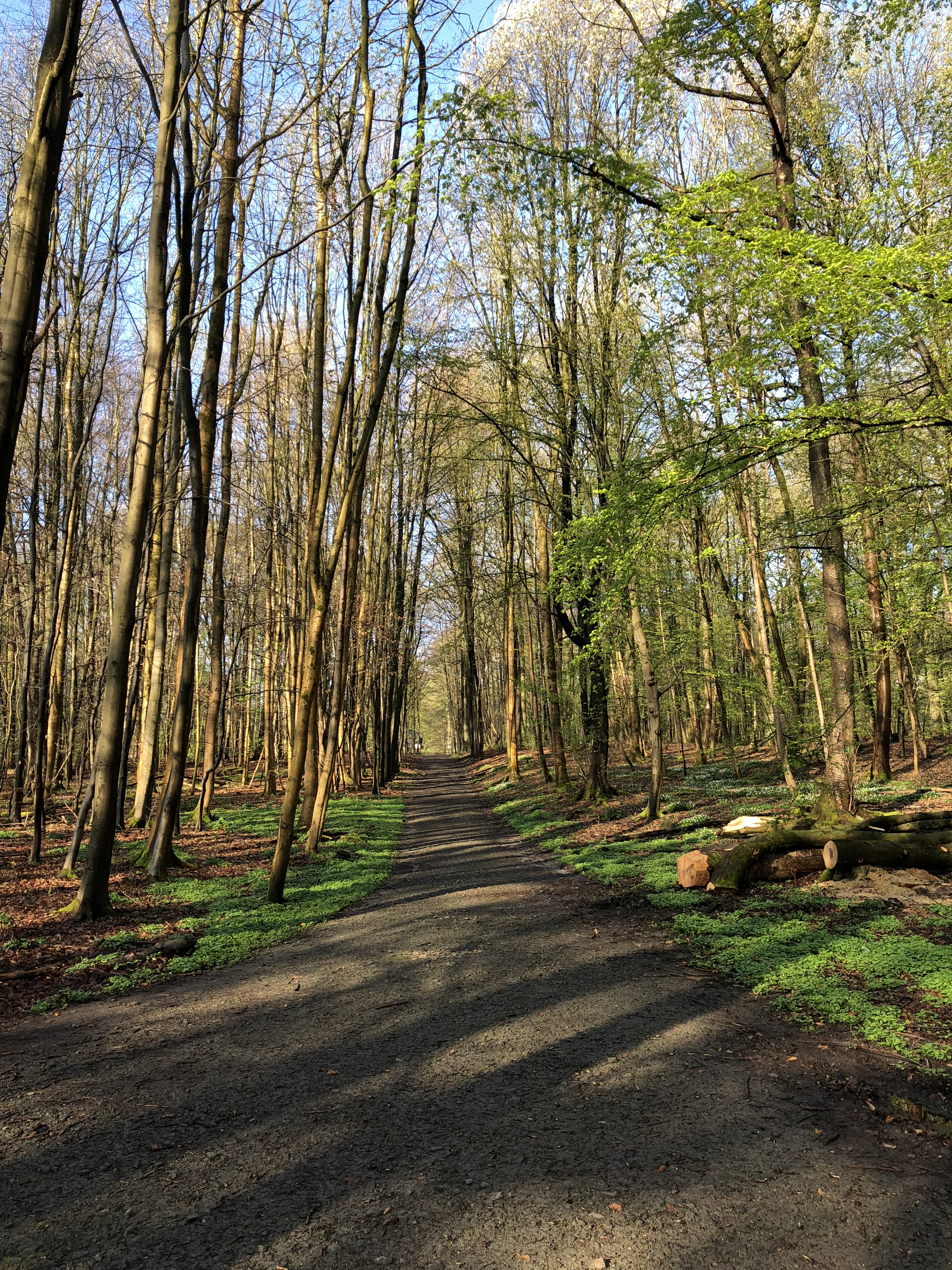
Drève du Fort Jaco/Fort Jacodreef

==== Dieweg ====
Located in the south of Uccle, this district is centred on the Dieweg, a street extending from the Royal Observatory to Uccle-Calevoet railway station. The neighbourhood itself is centred around the upper part of Wolvendael Park, Uccle Cemetery (also called Dieweg Cemetery), and the shops that line it. It is a wealthy neighbourhood, although there is a certain social mix.

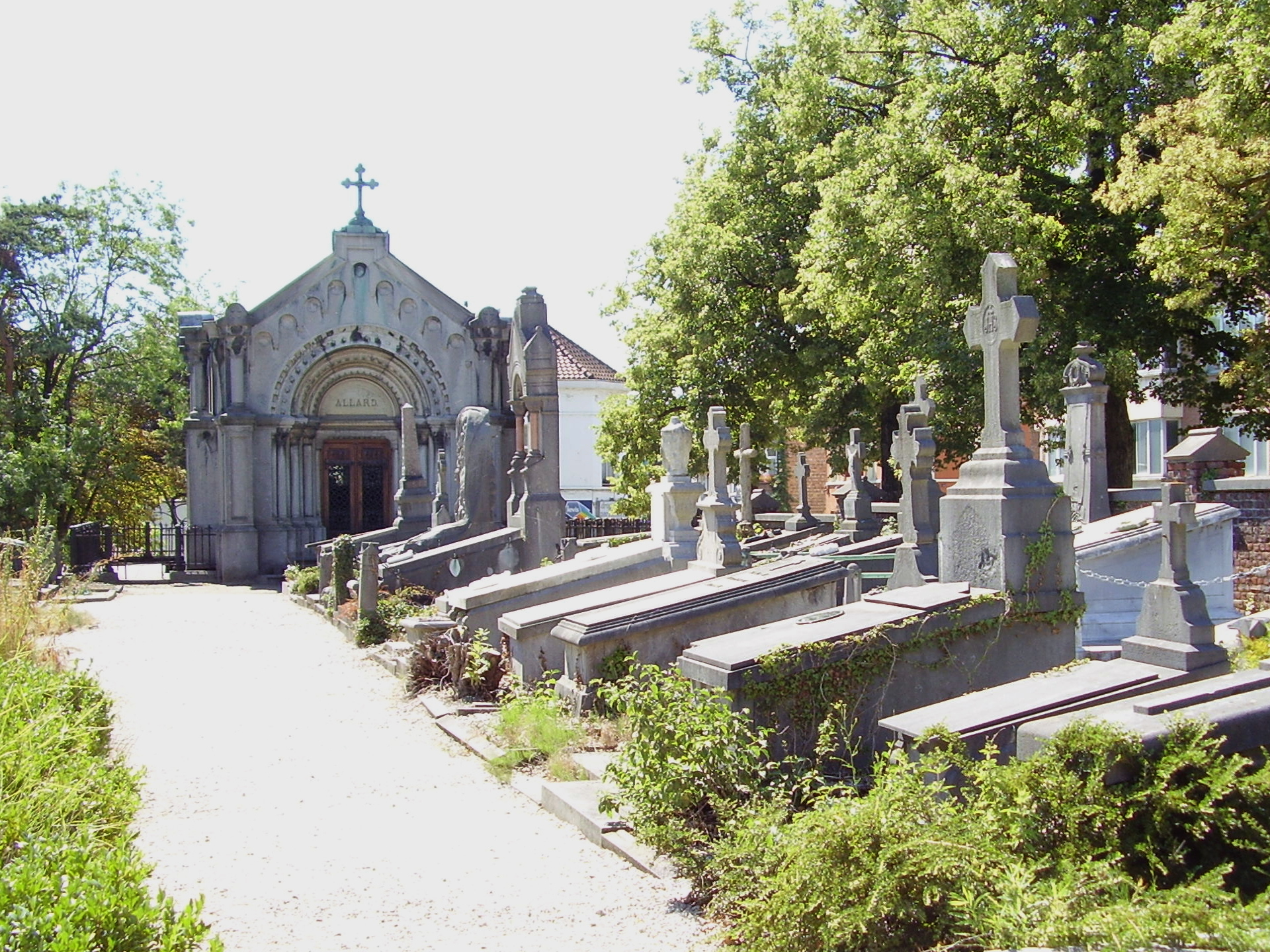
Uccle Cemetery

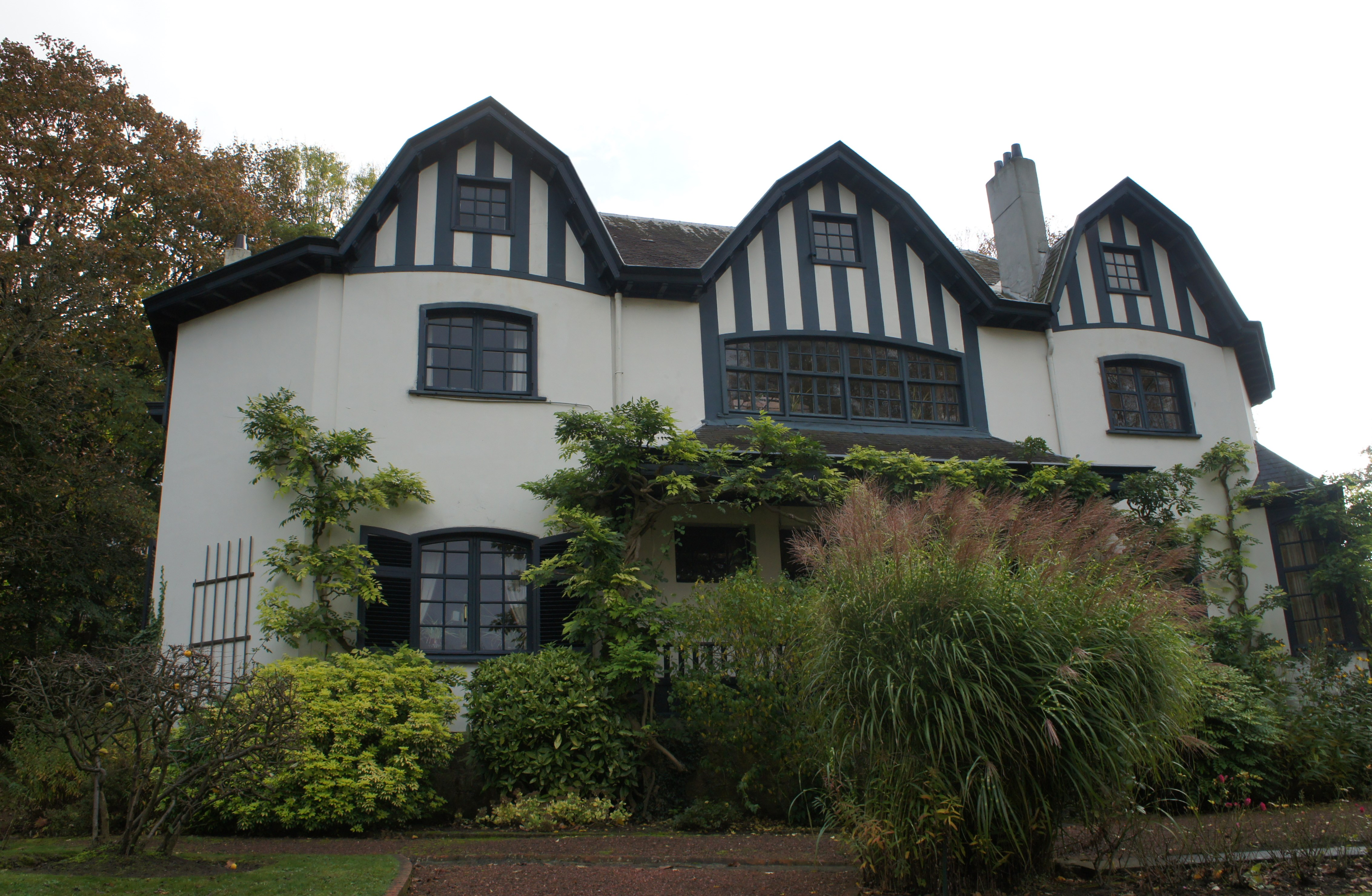
Villa Bloemenwerf

==== Stalle ====
Stalle is located in the west of Uccle, near the border with Forest. The area lies between the valleys of the Geleytsbeek and the Ukkelbeek and takes its name from the former lordship of Stalle. Its inhabitants were traditionally nicknamed the Zoêvelbooren ("sand farmers"), a reference to the district's agricultural past.

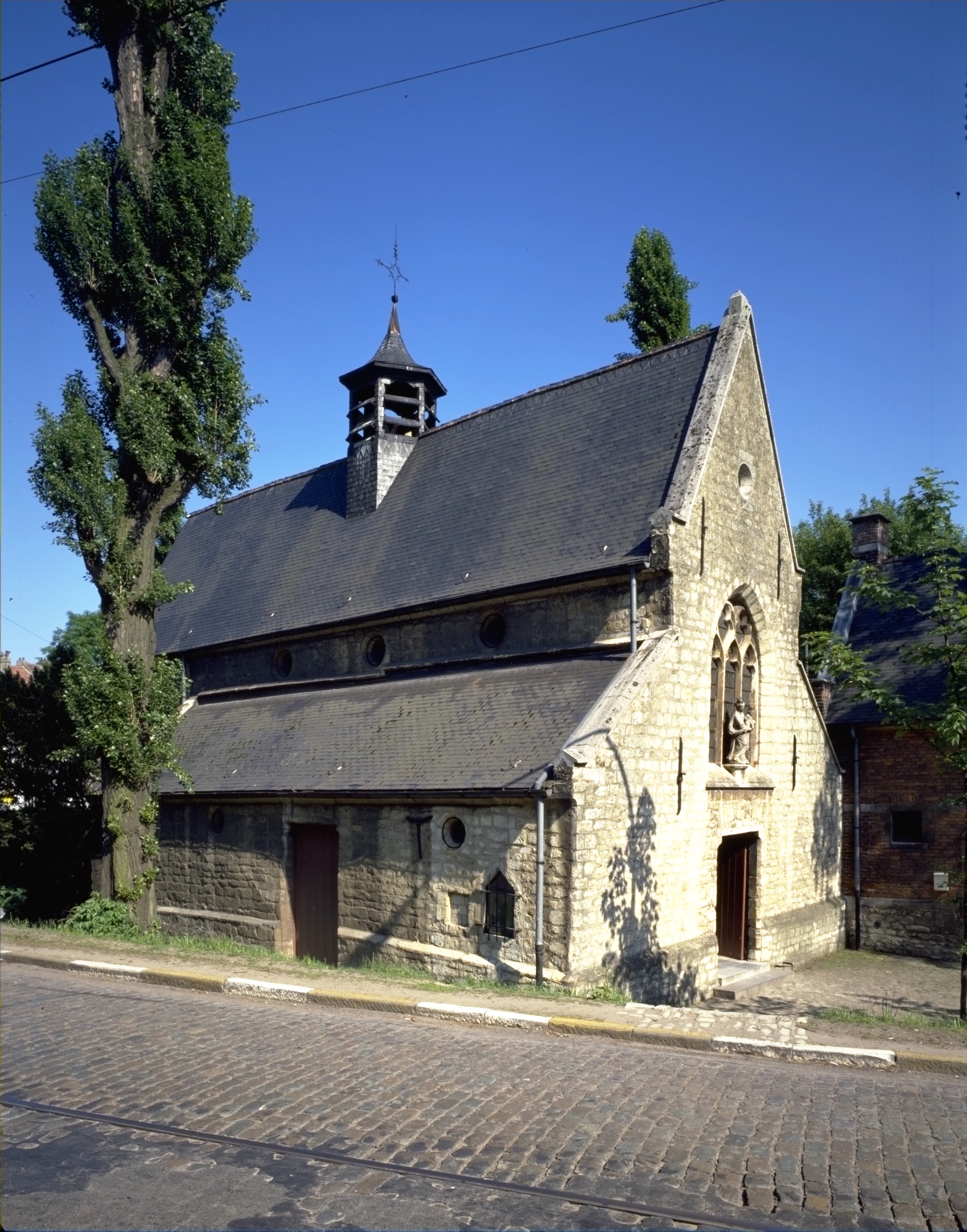
Stalle Chapel

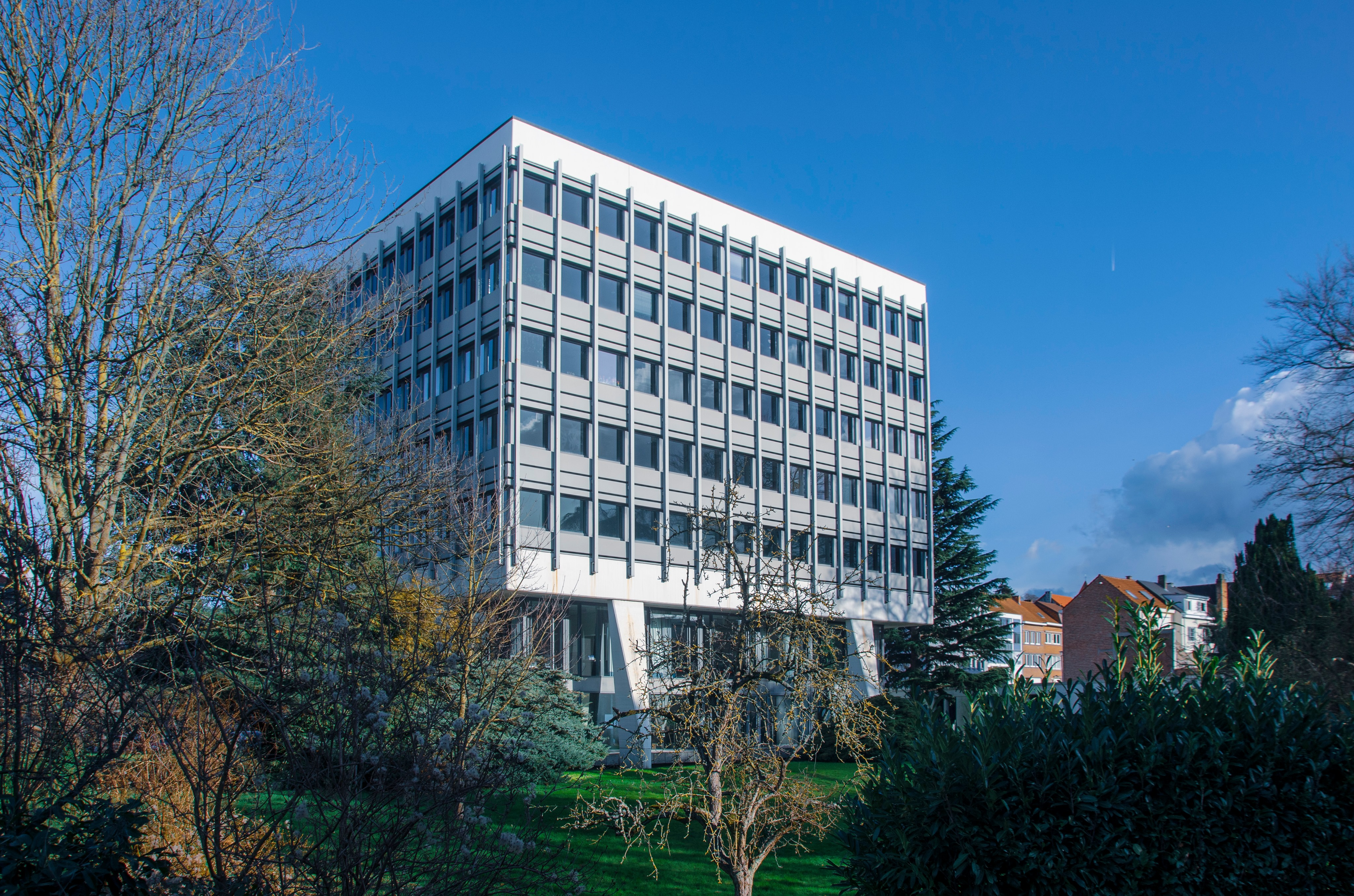
Headquarters of the Belgian Red Cross

==== Calevoet/Kalevoet ====
Calevoet/Kalevoet lies in the south-west of Uccle, bordering the Flemish municipalities of Drogenbos, Beersel, and Linkebeek. The name is composed of cal + devort, meaning "grassless ford". However, its resemblance with the Dutch Karel te voet, meaning "Charles bare foot", gave birth to the legend that Charlemagne crossed the ford at Calevoet barefooted.

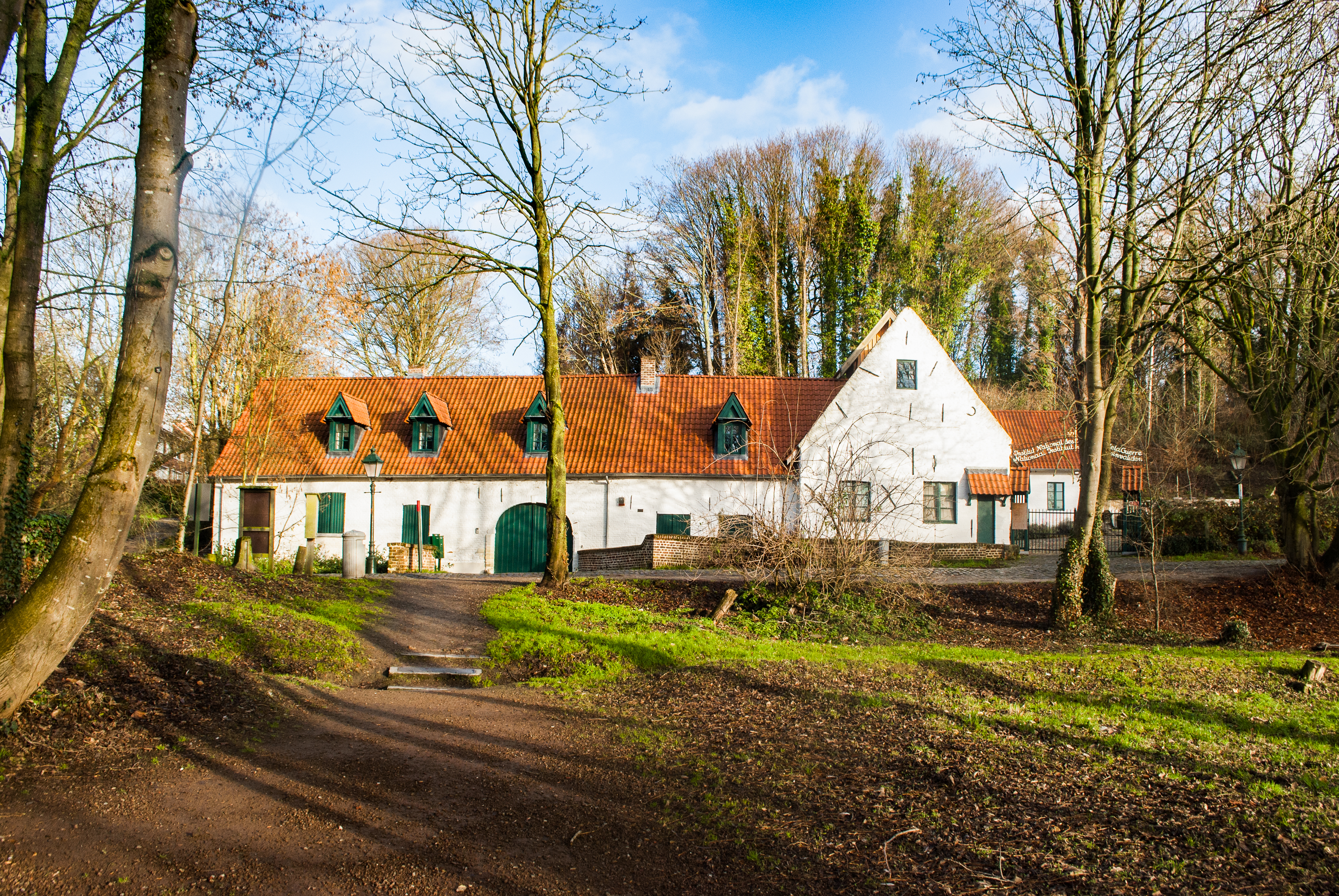
Nekkersgat Mill

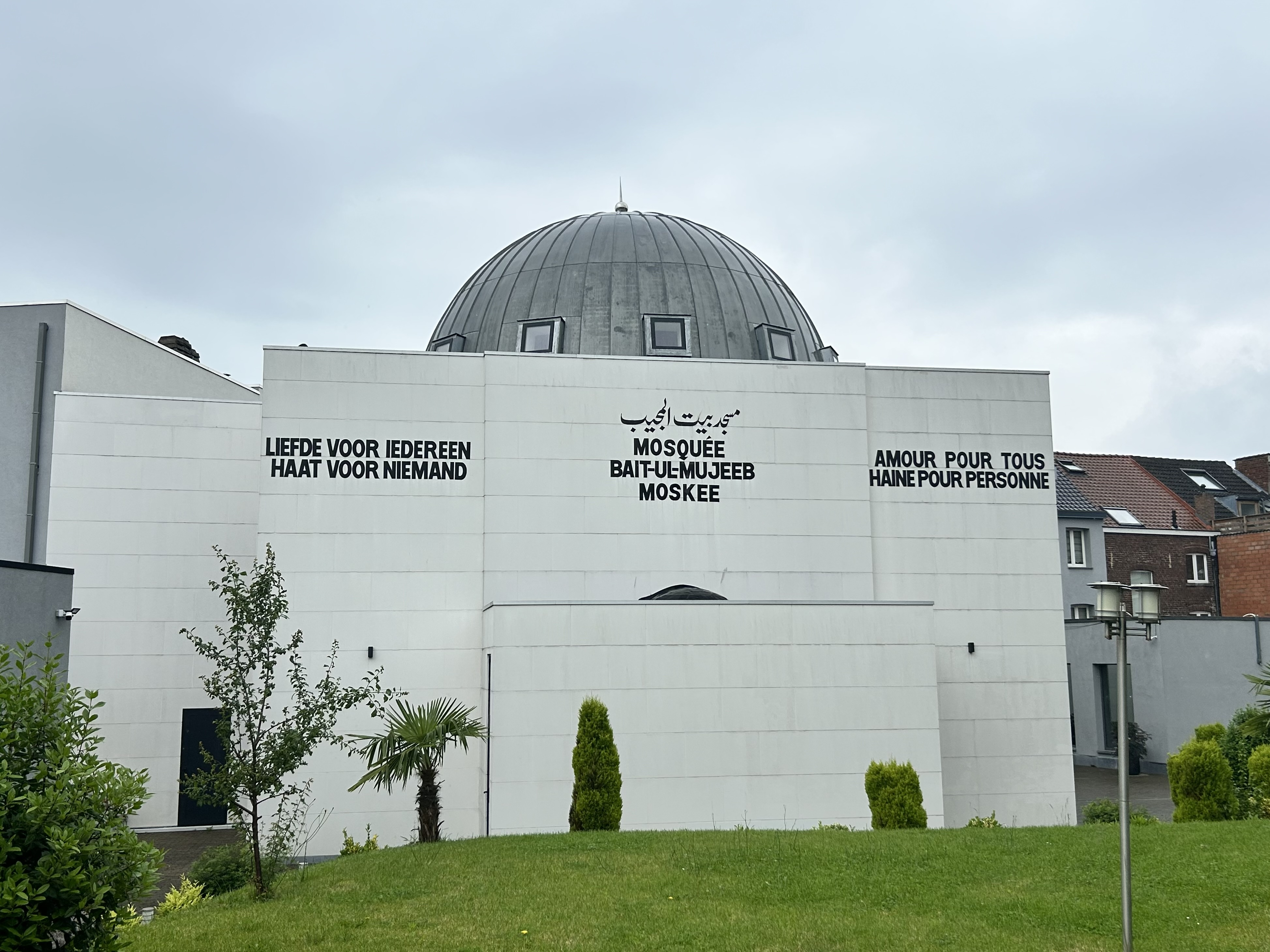
Bait-ul-Mujeeb Mosque

==== Prince of Orange ====
Located in the south of Uccle, this district's name comes from the Avenue du Prince d'Orange/Prins van Oranjelaan, itself named after William II of the Netherlands, Prince of Orange-Nassau.

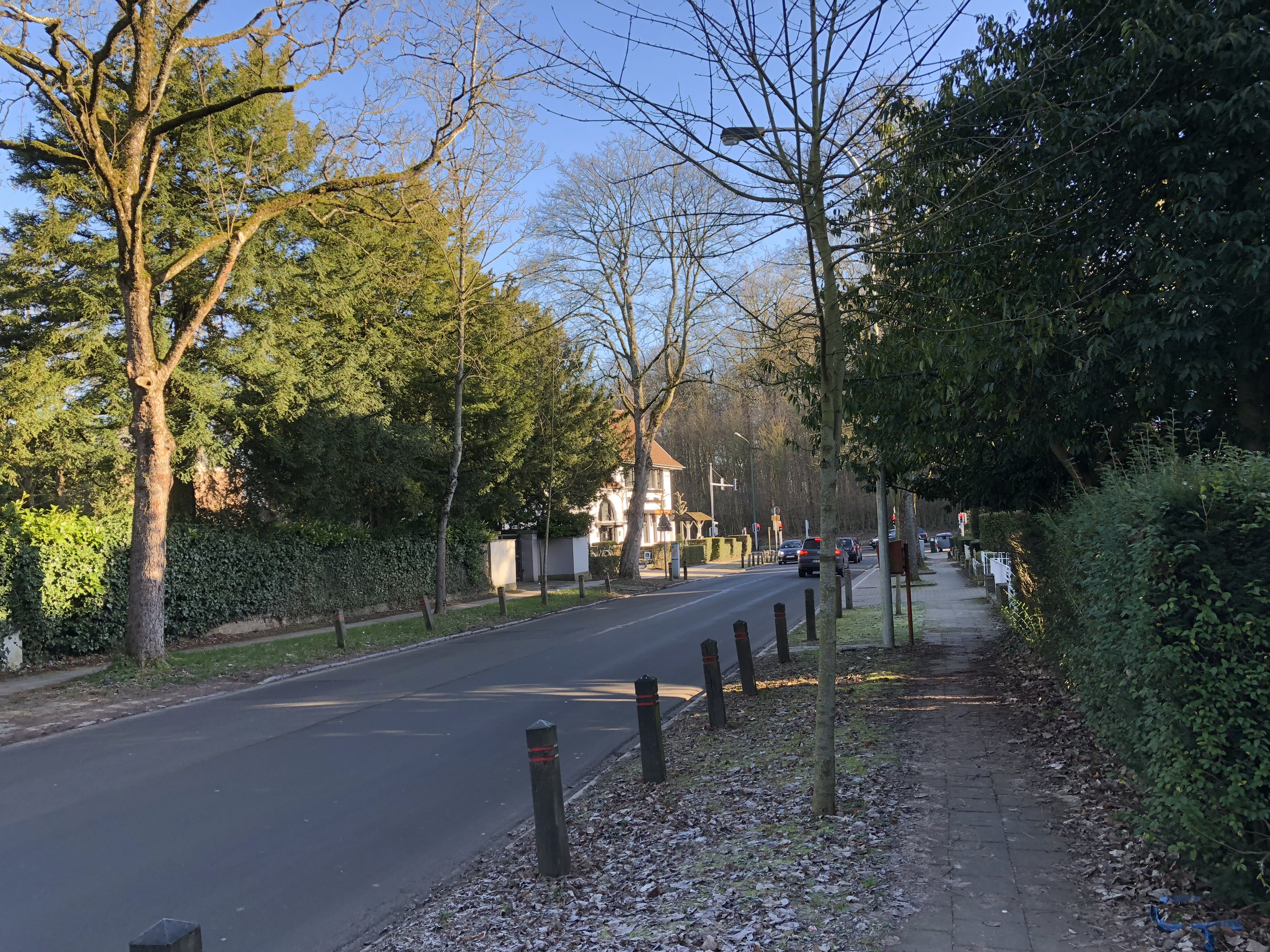
Avenue du Prince d'Orange/Prins van Oranjelaan

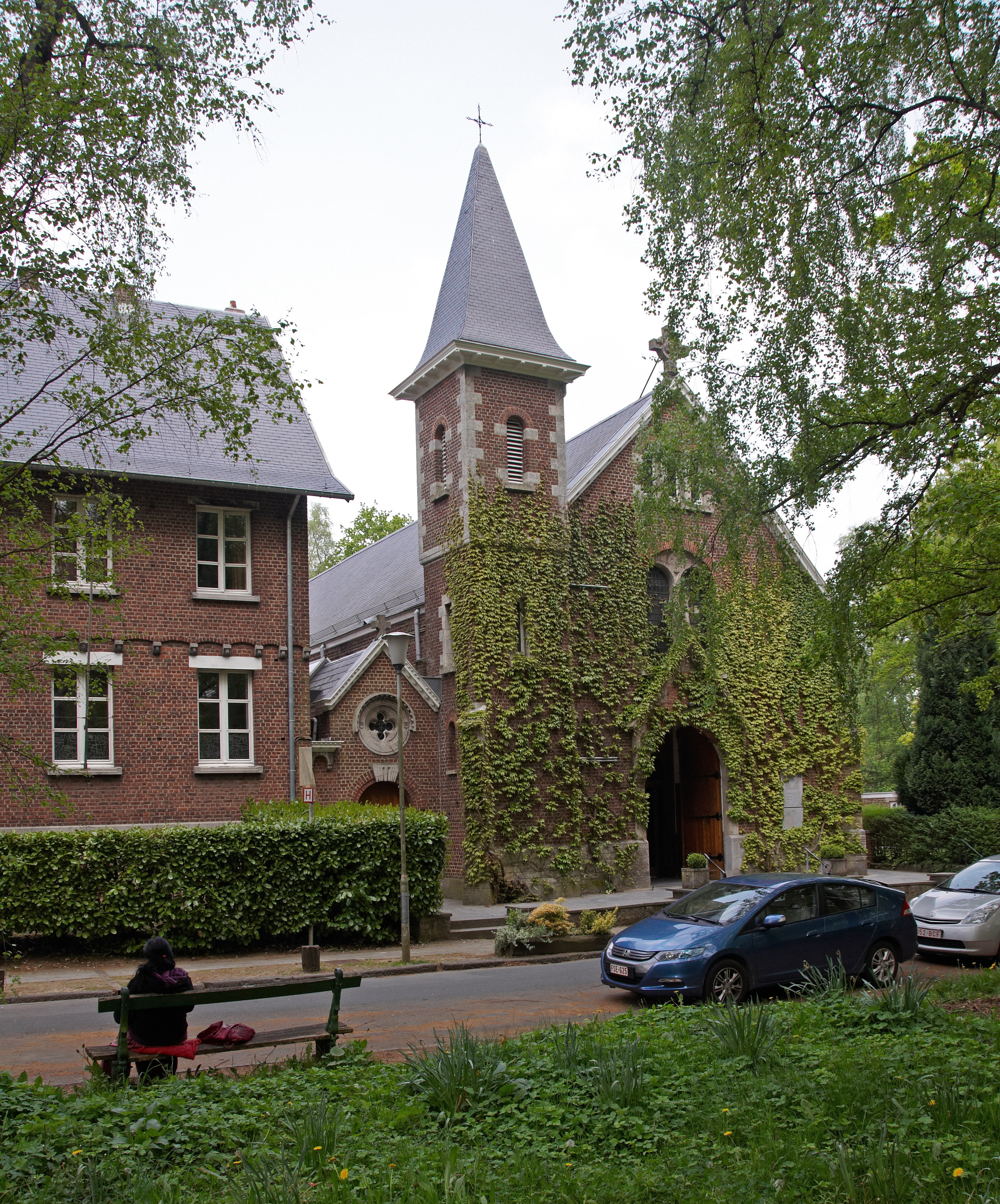
Church of St. Anne

==== Petite-Espinette/Kleine Hut ====
Situated on the southern border of Uccle, where the Chaussée de Waterloo meets the Drève Saint-Hubert/Sint-Hubertusdreef and the Flemish municipality of Sint-Genesius-Rode, the district takes its name either from a small hut once located there and from the thorny bushes that characterised the landscape. Originally the site of an inn and the terminus of Belgium's first electrified tram line, the area is now recognised for its prestigious residential character and shopping amenities.

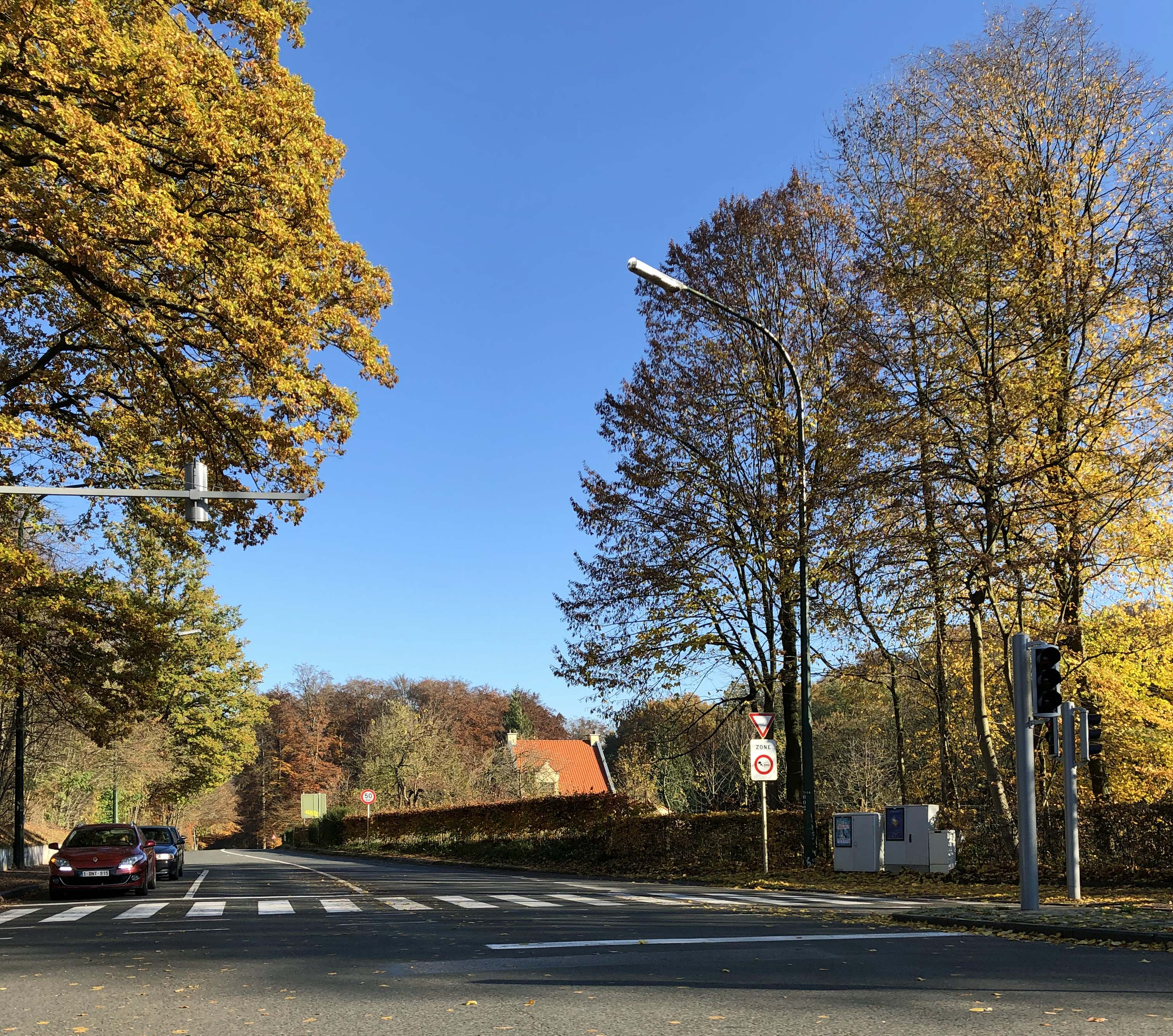
Drève Saint-Hubert/Sint-Hubertusdreef

=== Watermael-Boitsfort/Watermaal-Bosvoorde ===
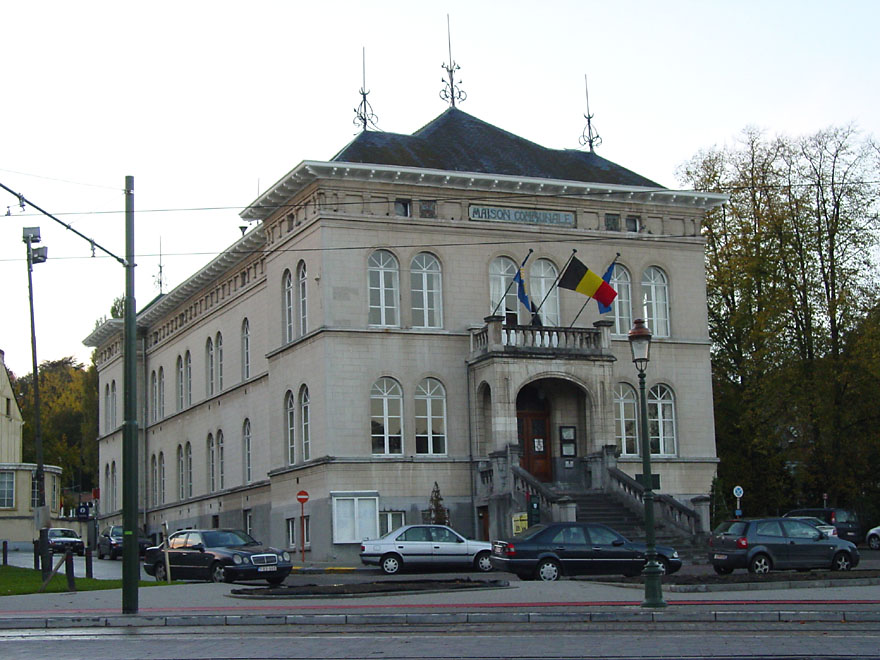
Watermael-Boitsfort's Municipal Hall

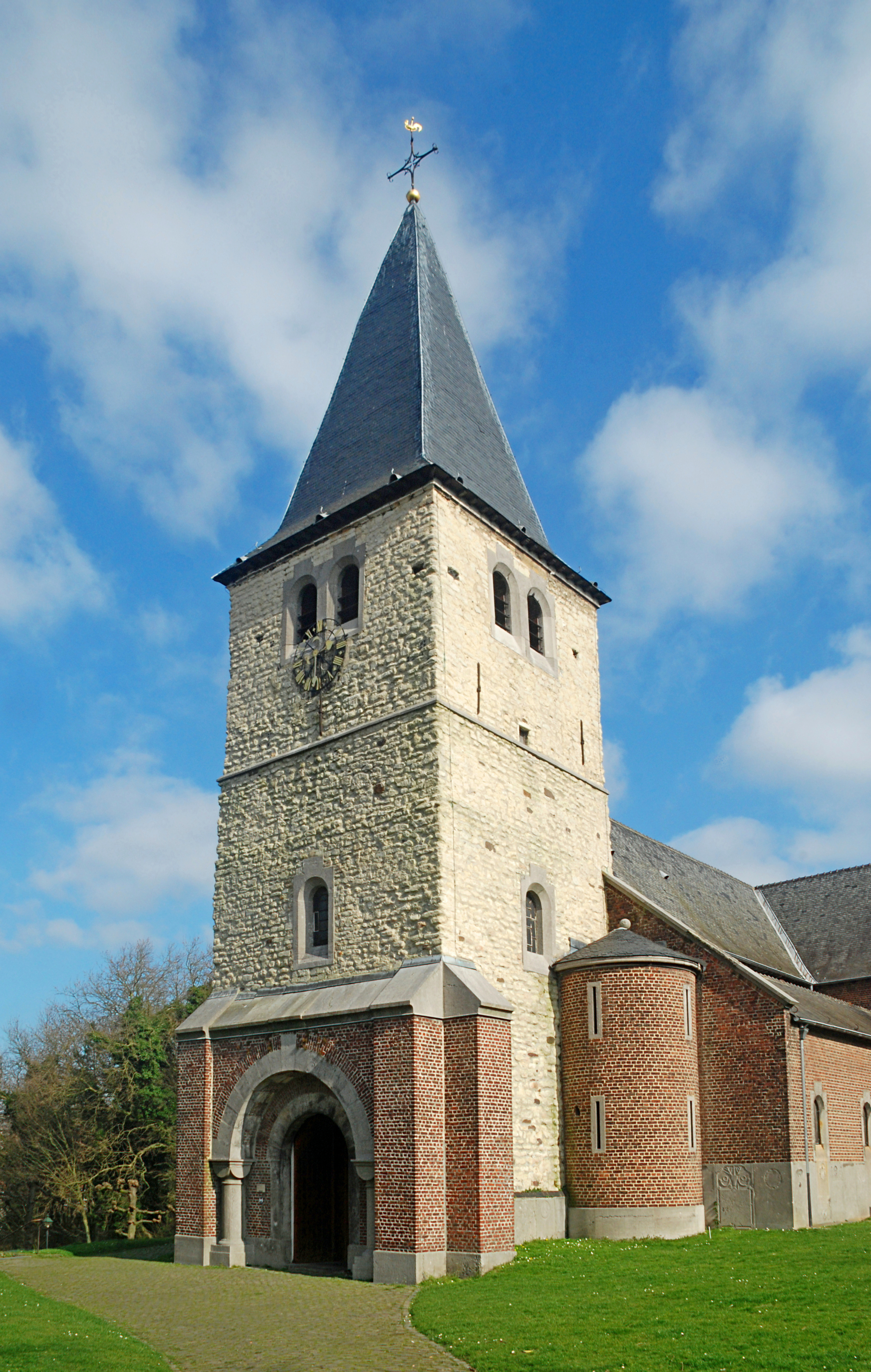
Church of St. Clement

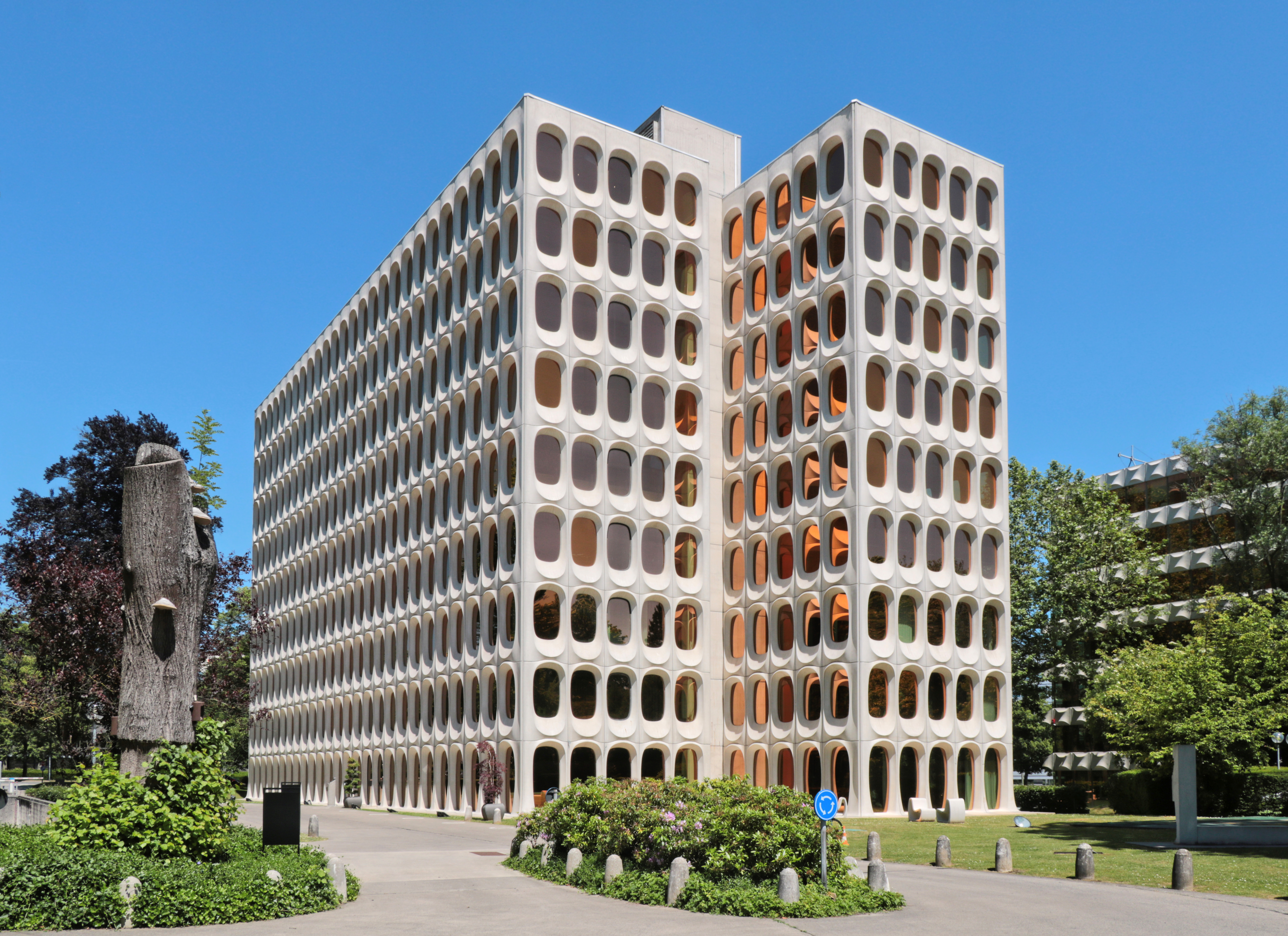
CBR Building

==== Le Logis ====
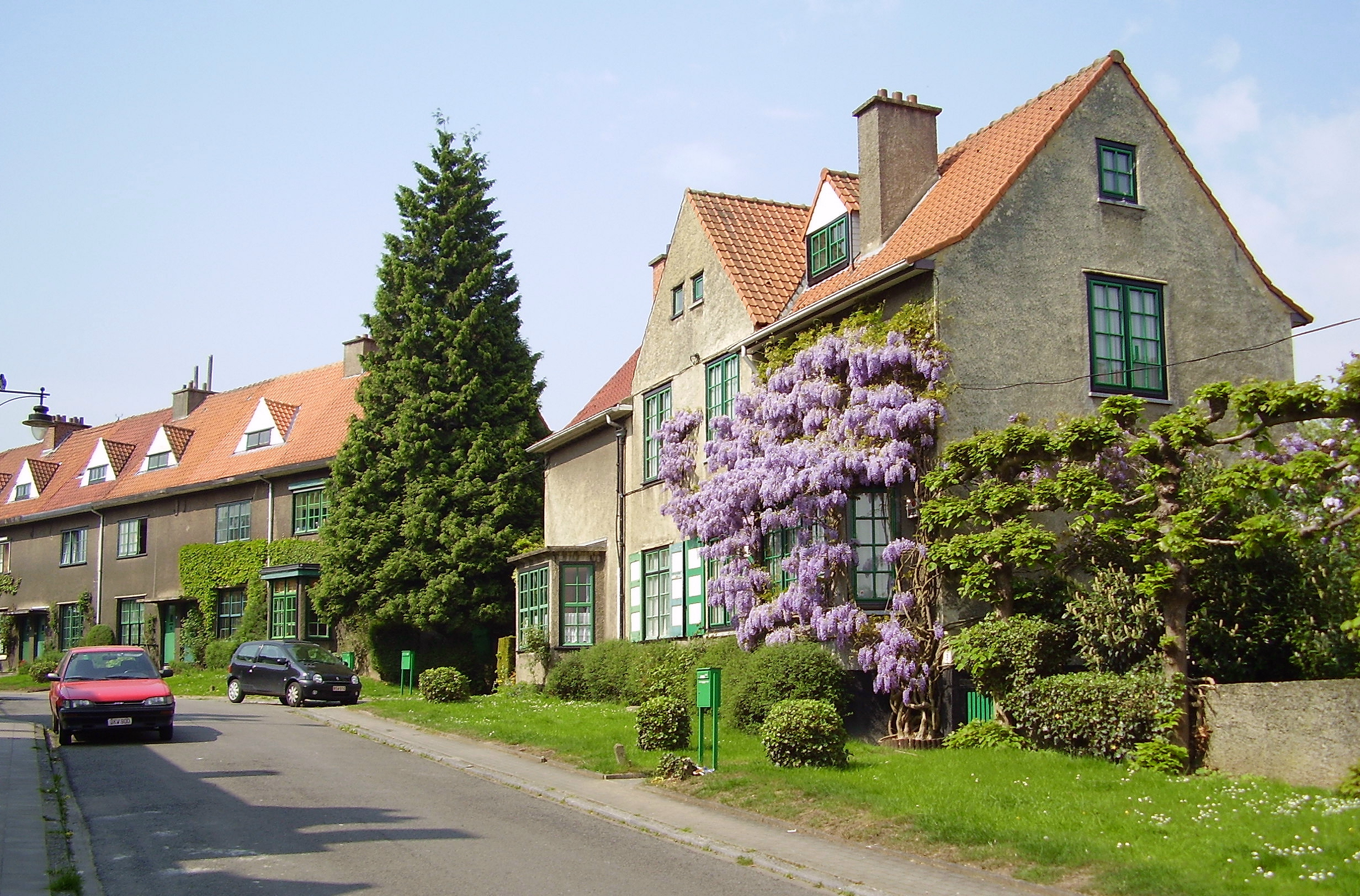
Le Logis garden city

==== Floréal ====
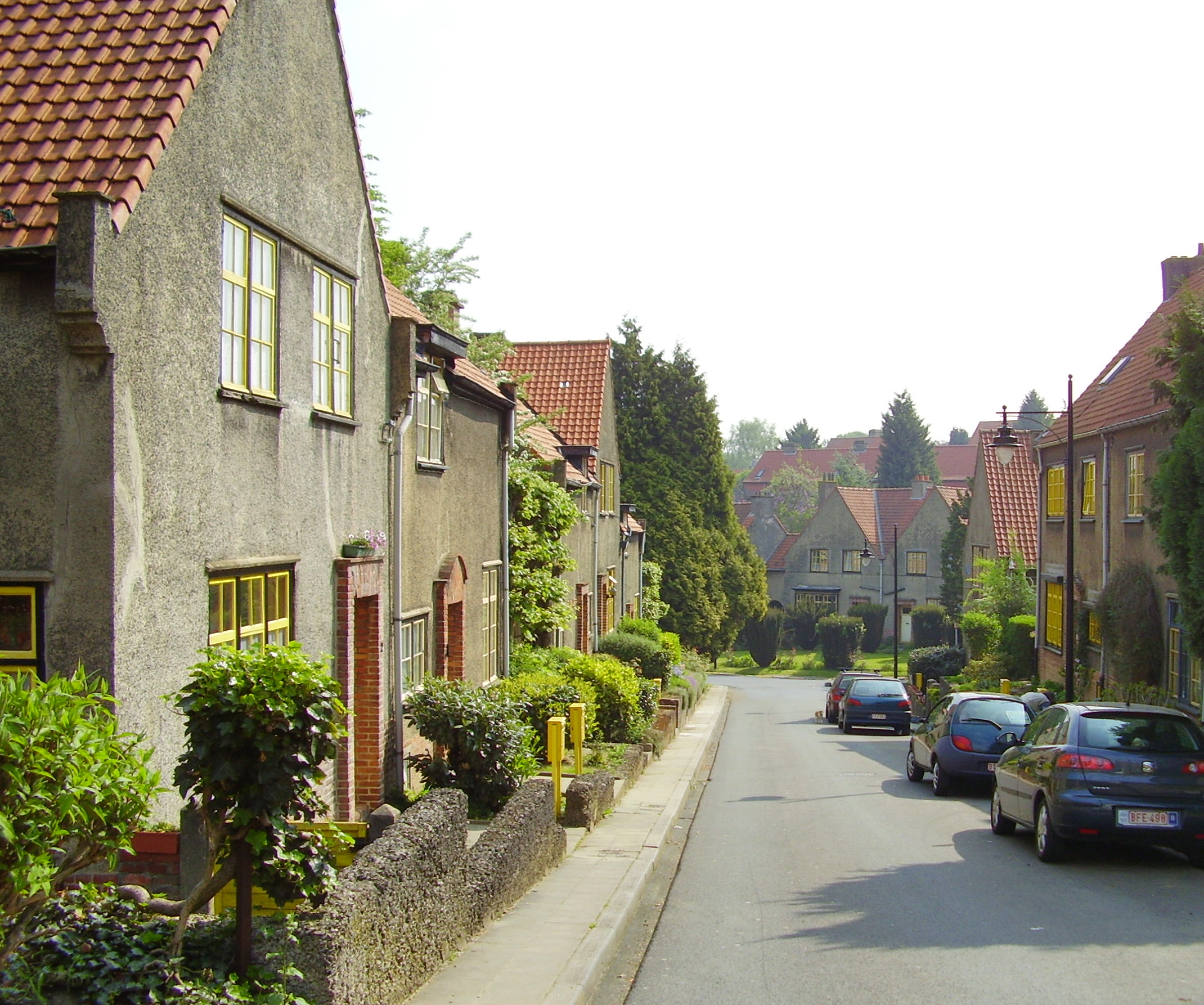
Floréal garden city

==== Coin du Balai/Bezemhoek ====
Located at the south-eastern tip of Brussels.

=== Woluwe-Saint-Lambert/Sint-Lambrechts-Woluwe ===
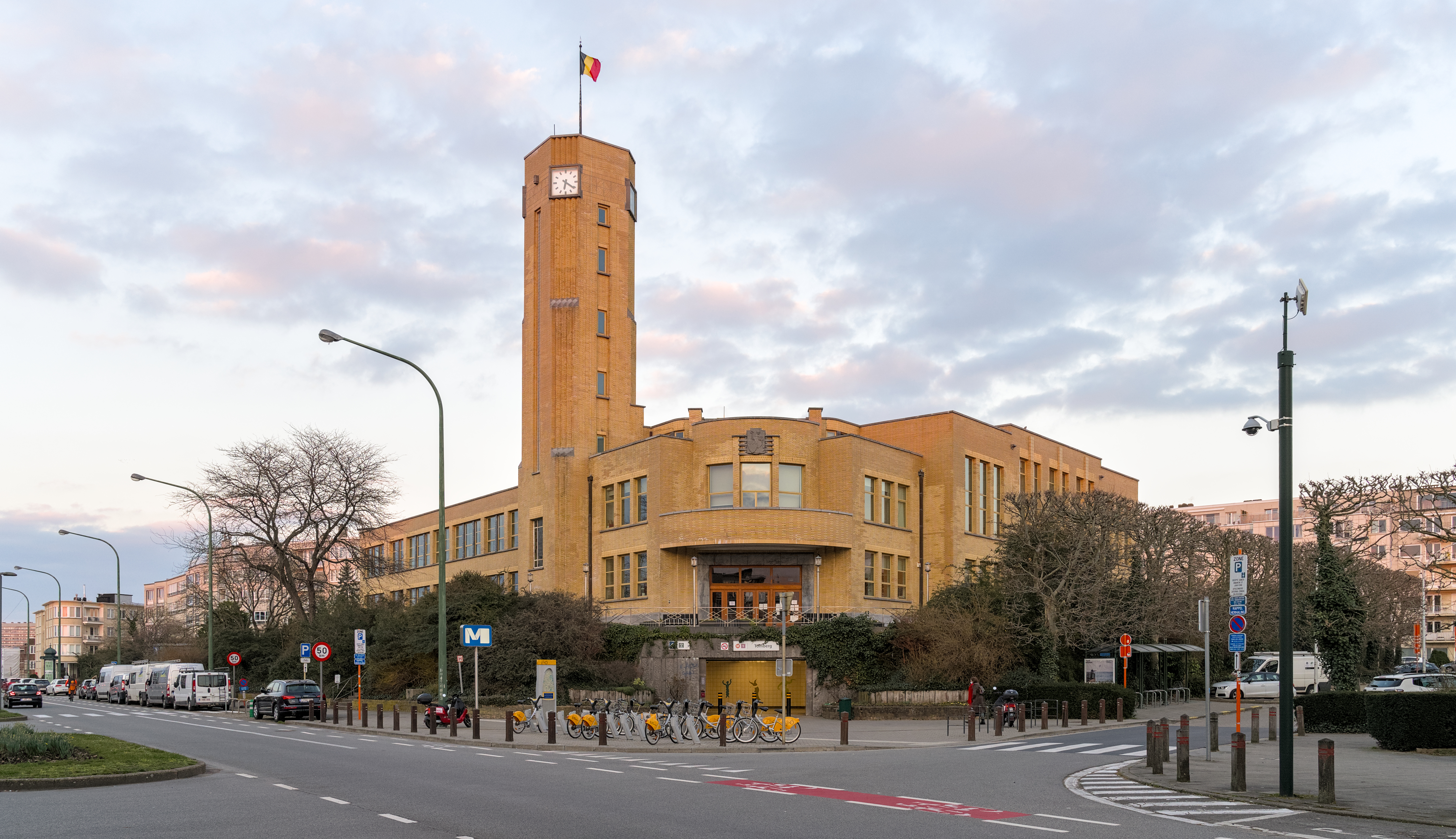
Woluwe-Saint-Lambert's Municipal Hall

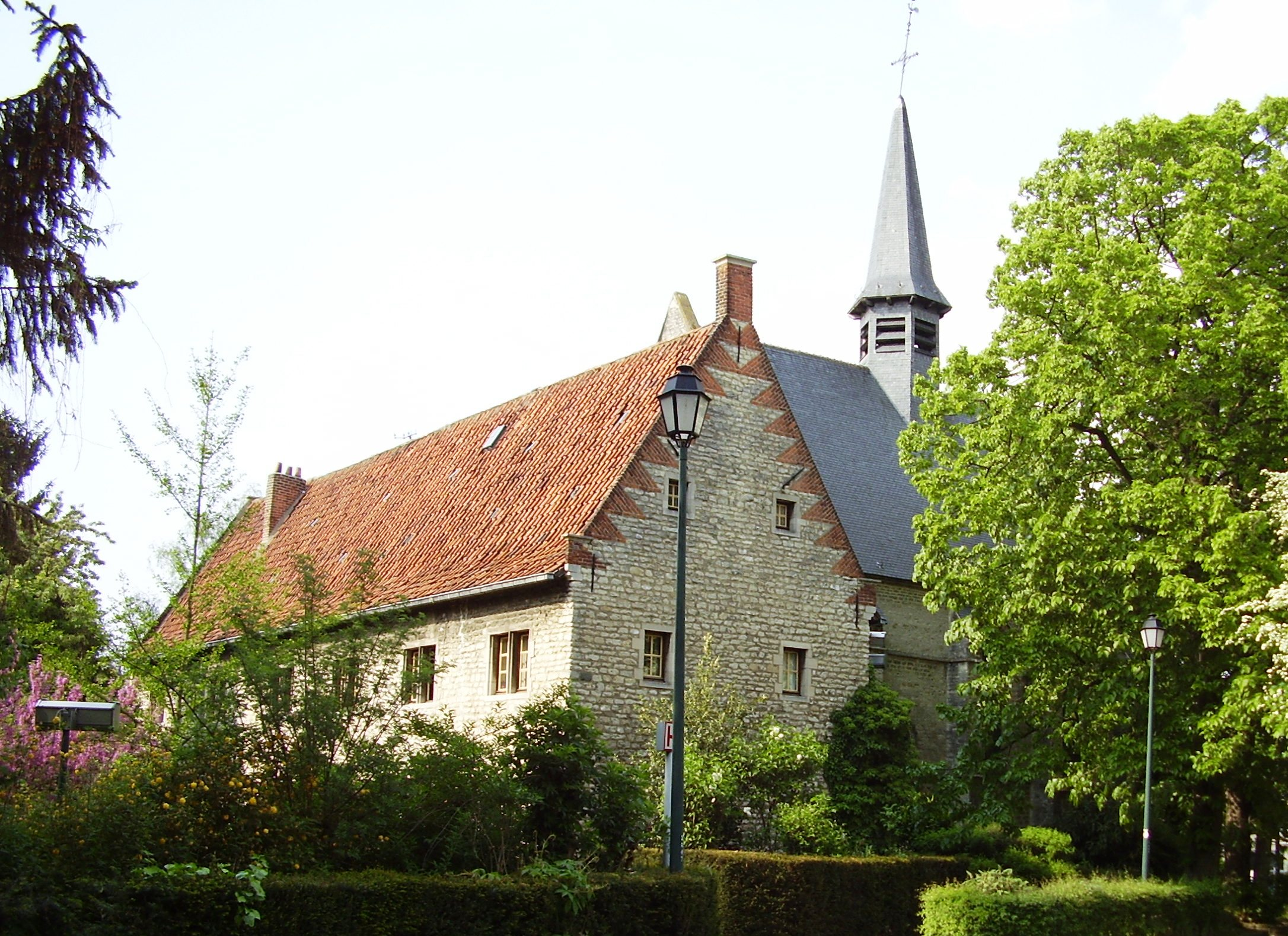
Chapel of Mary the Miserable

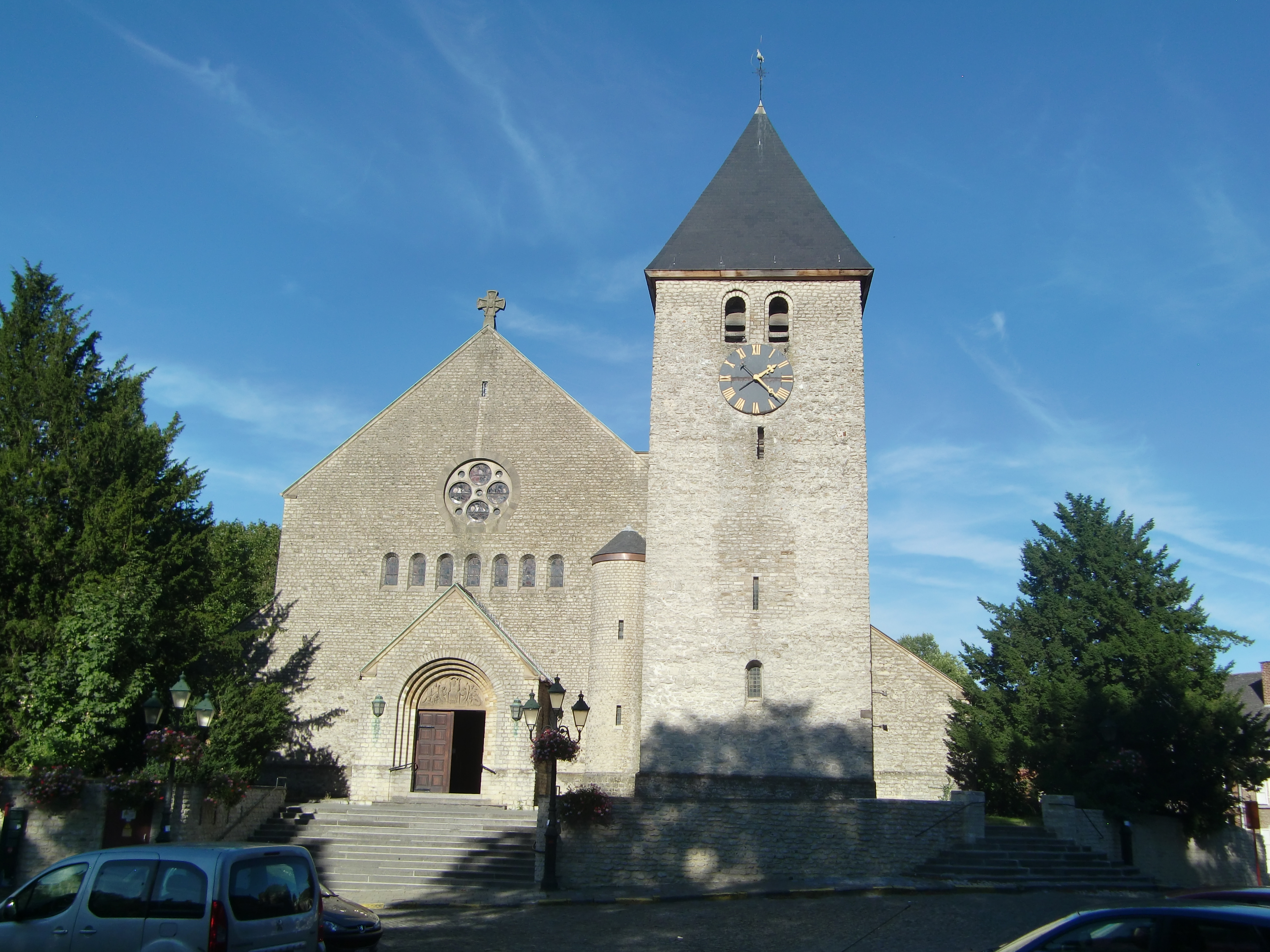
Church of St. Lambert

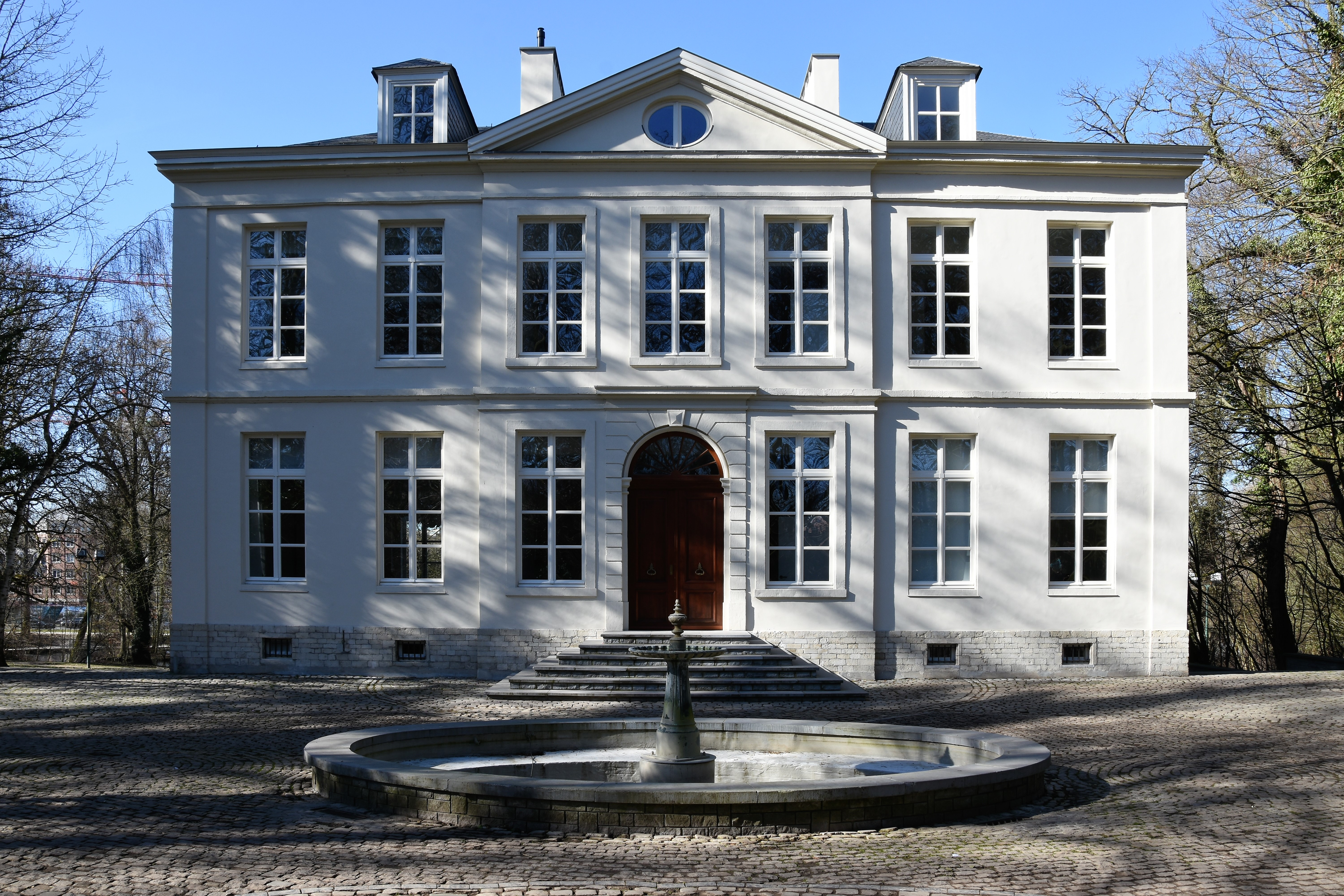
Château Malou

==== Georges Henri ====
Located in the west of Woluwe-Saint-Lambert.

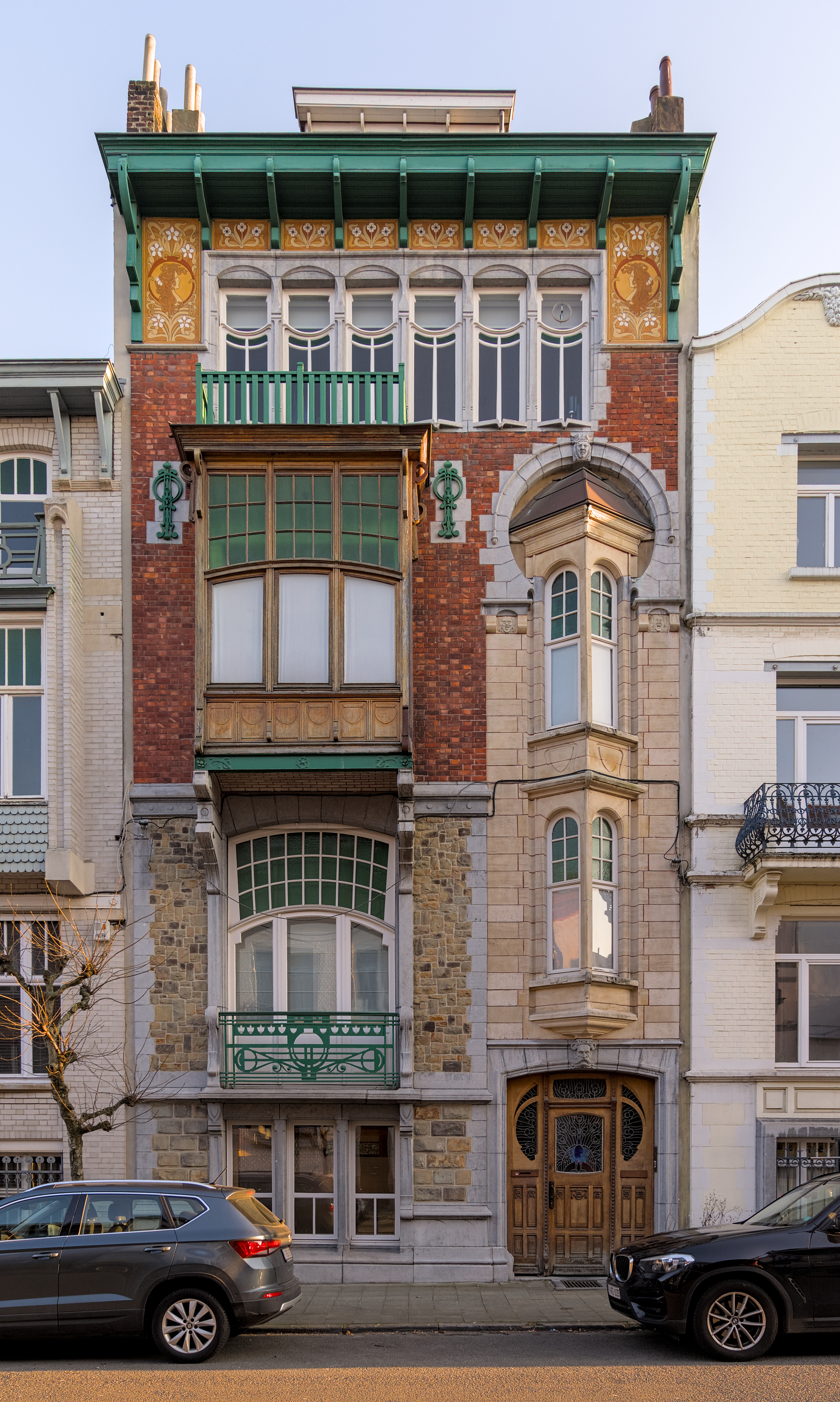
Frankinet House

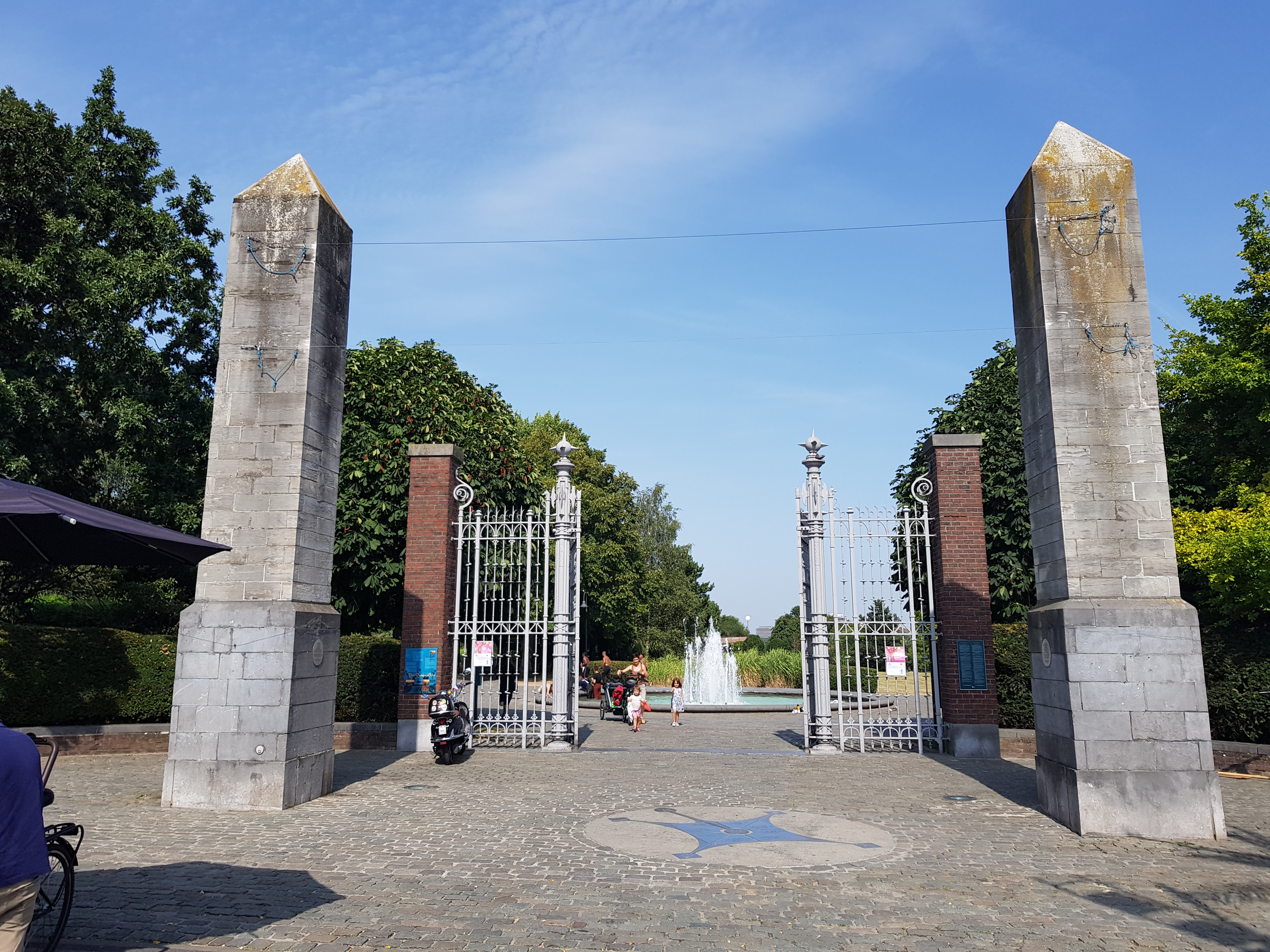
Georges Henri Park

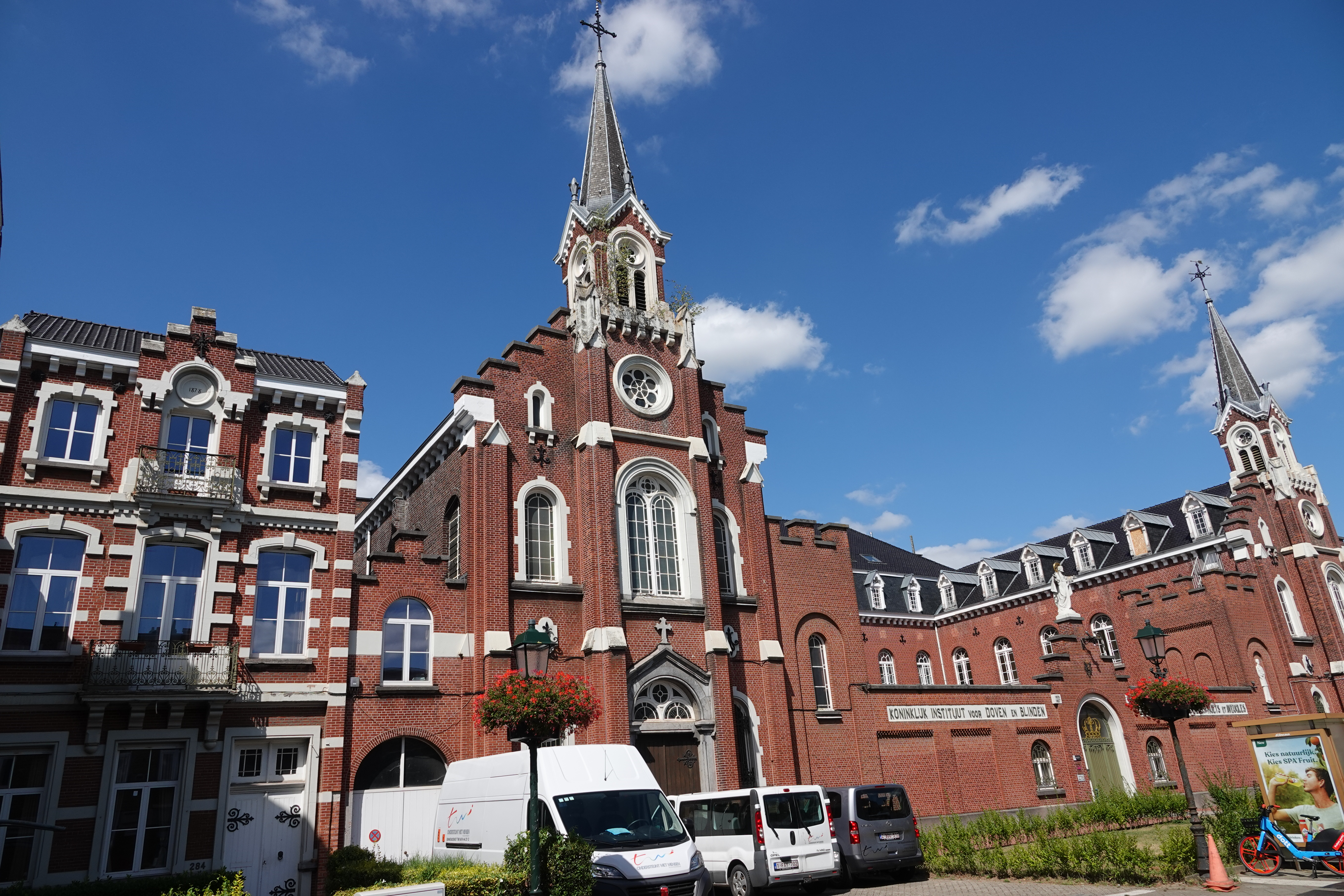
Royal Institute for the Blind, Deaf and Mute

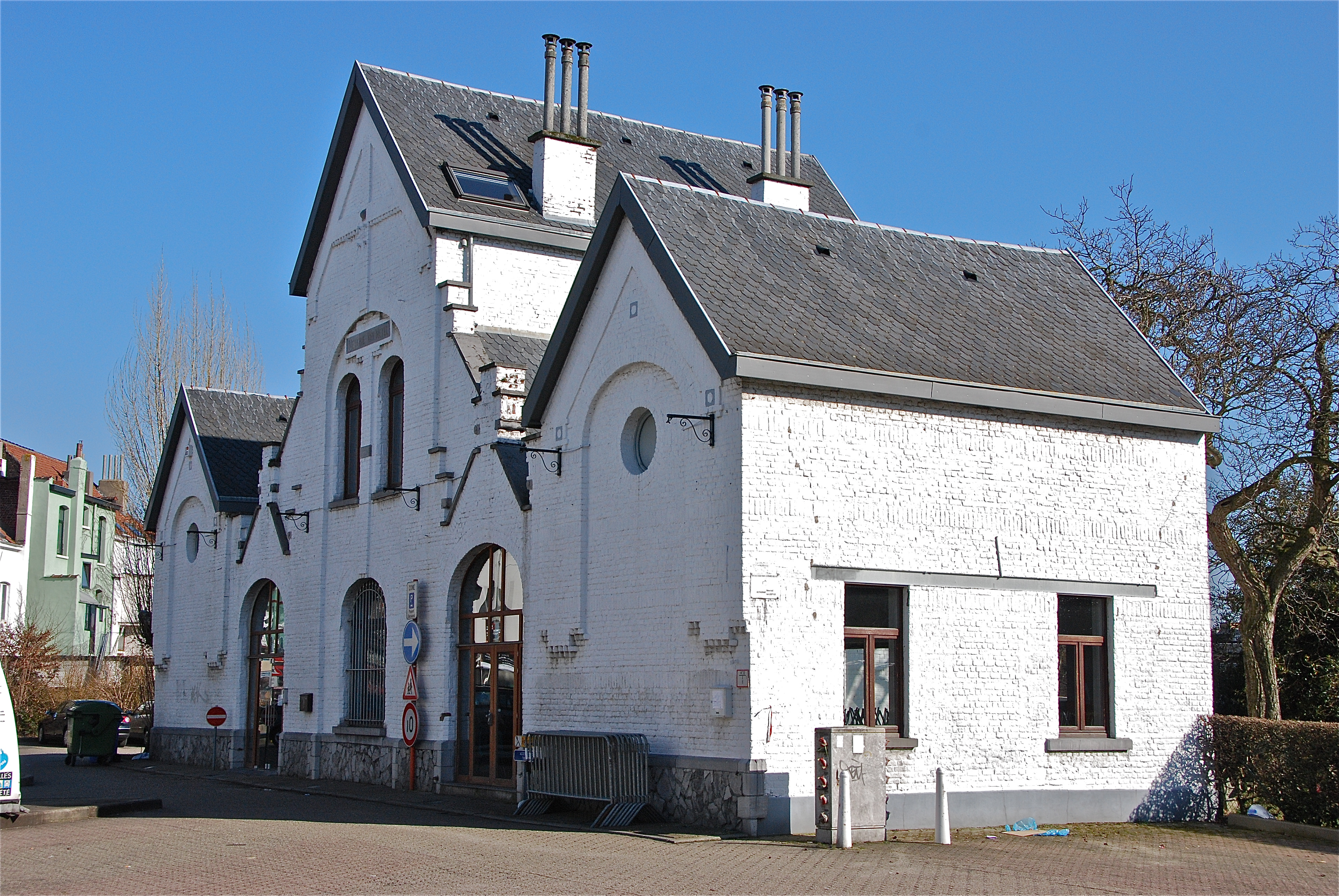
Métairie Van Meyel

==== Roodebeek ====
Located in the centre of Woluwe-Saint-Lambert.

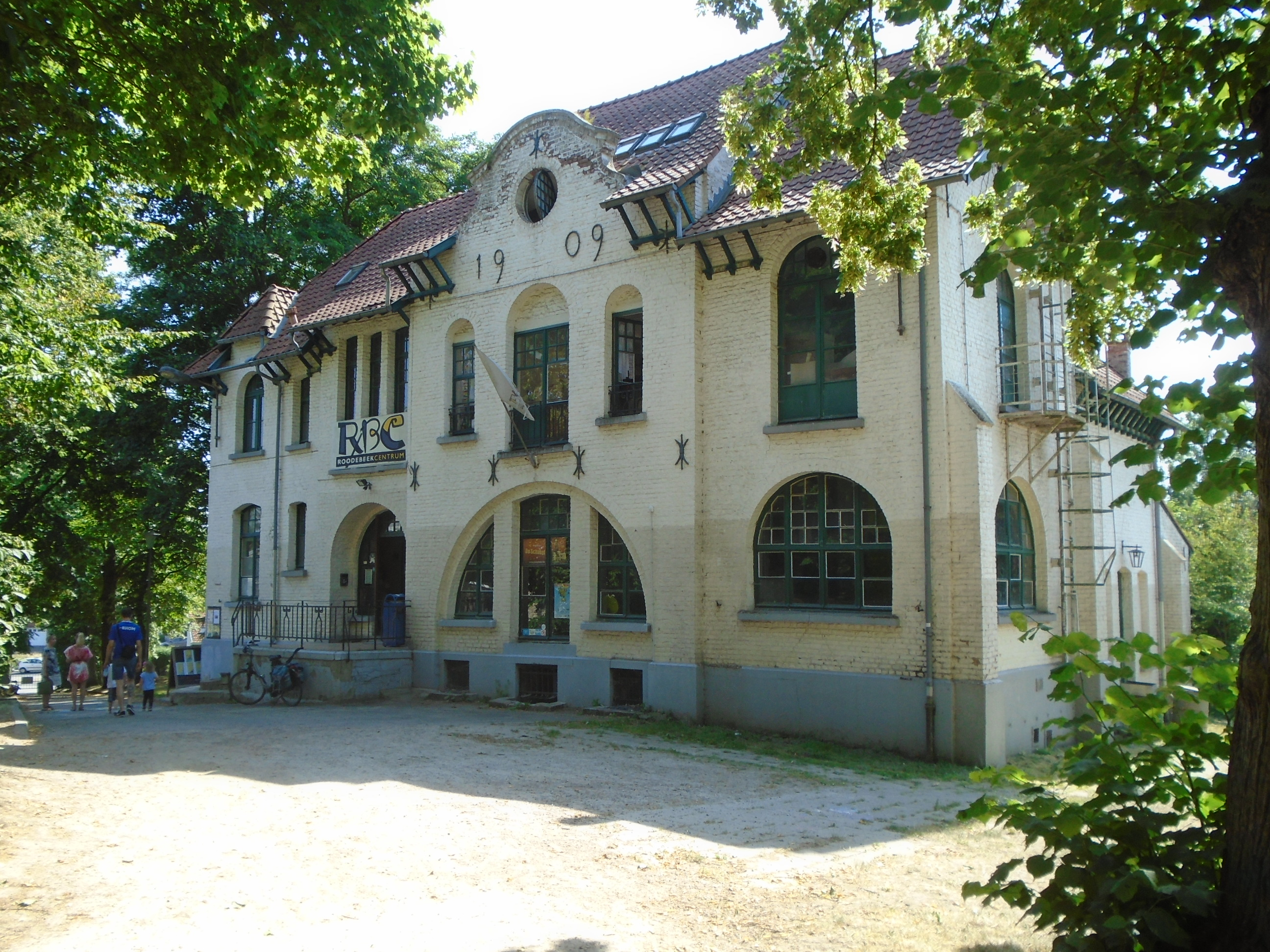
Villa Montald

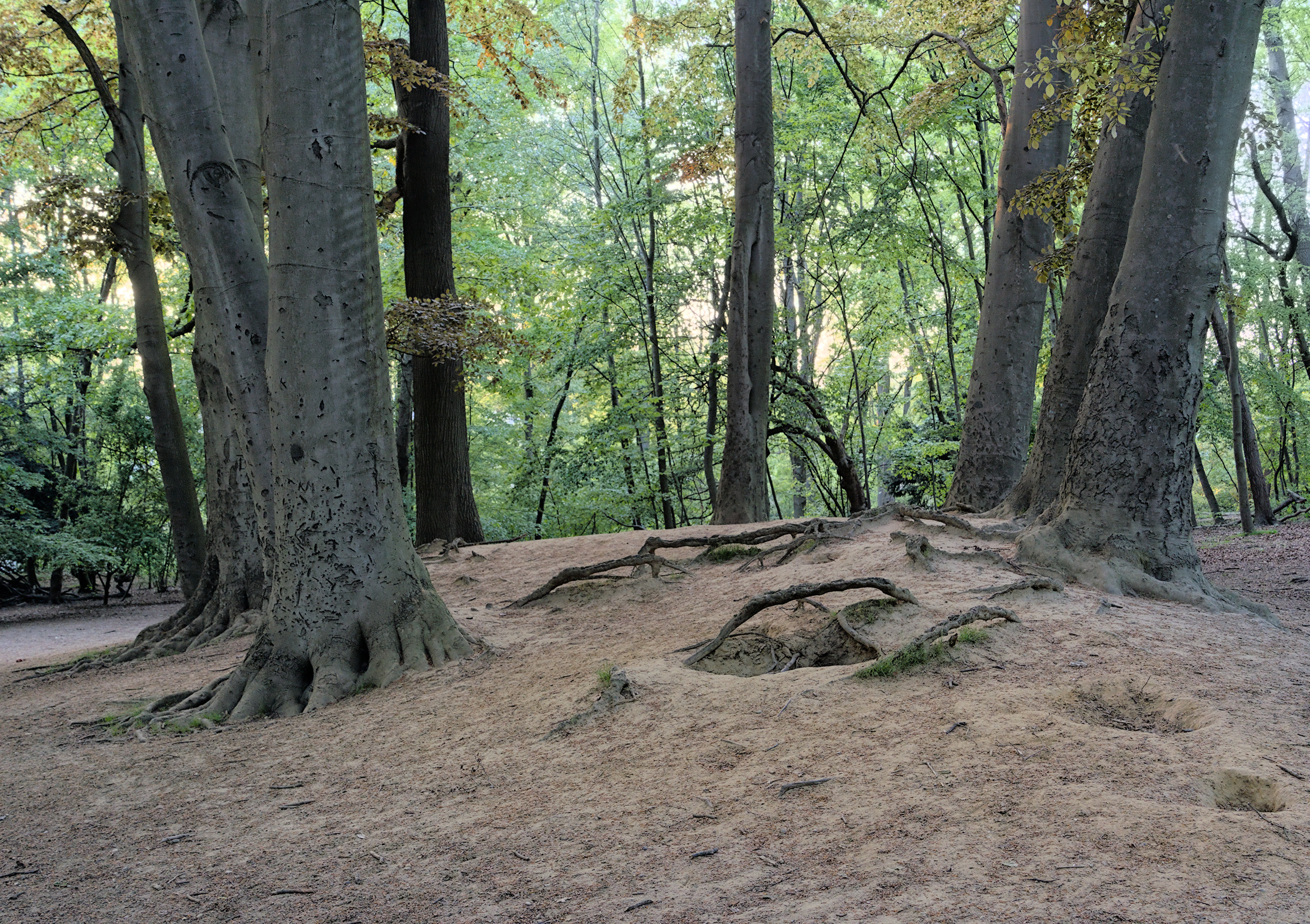
Roodebeek Park

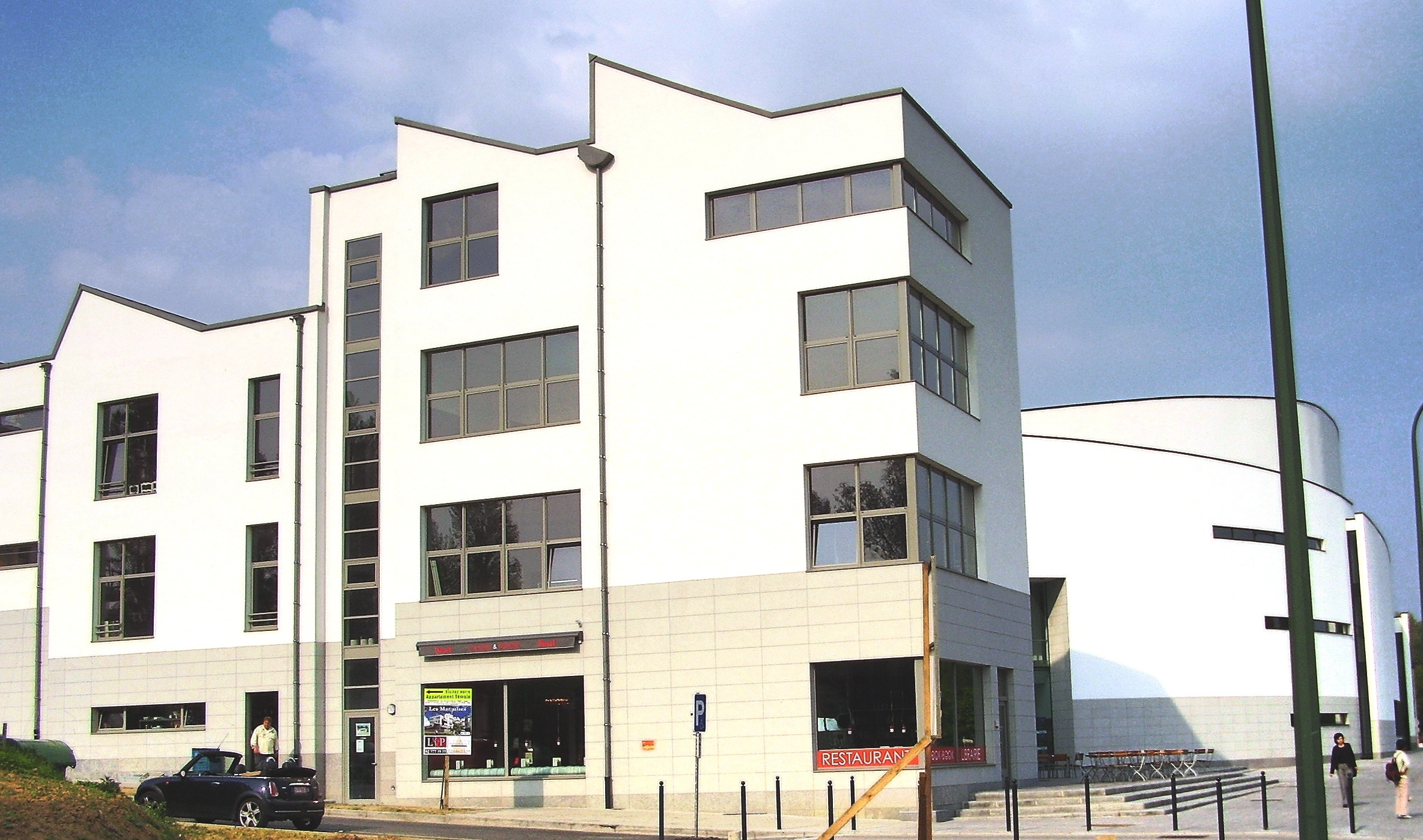
Wolubilis

==== Constellations Quarter ====
Located in the north-west of Woluwe-Saint-Lambert, the Constellations Quarter (French: Quartier des Constellations, Dutch: Sterrebeeldenwijk) is so named because its streets are almost all named after constellations.

==== Kapelleveld ====
Located in the east of Woluwe-Saint-Lambert.

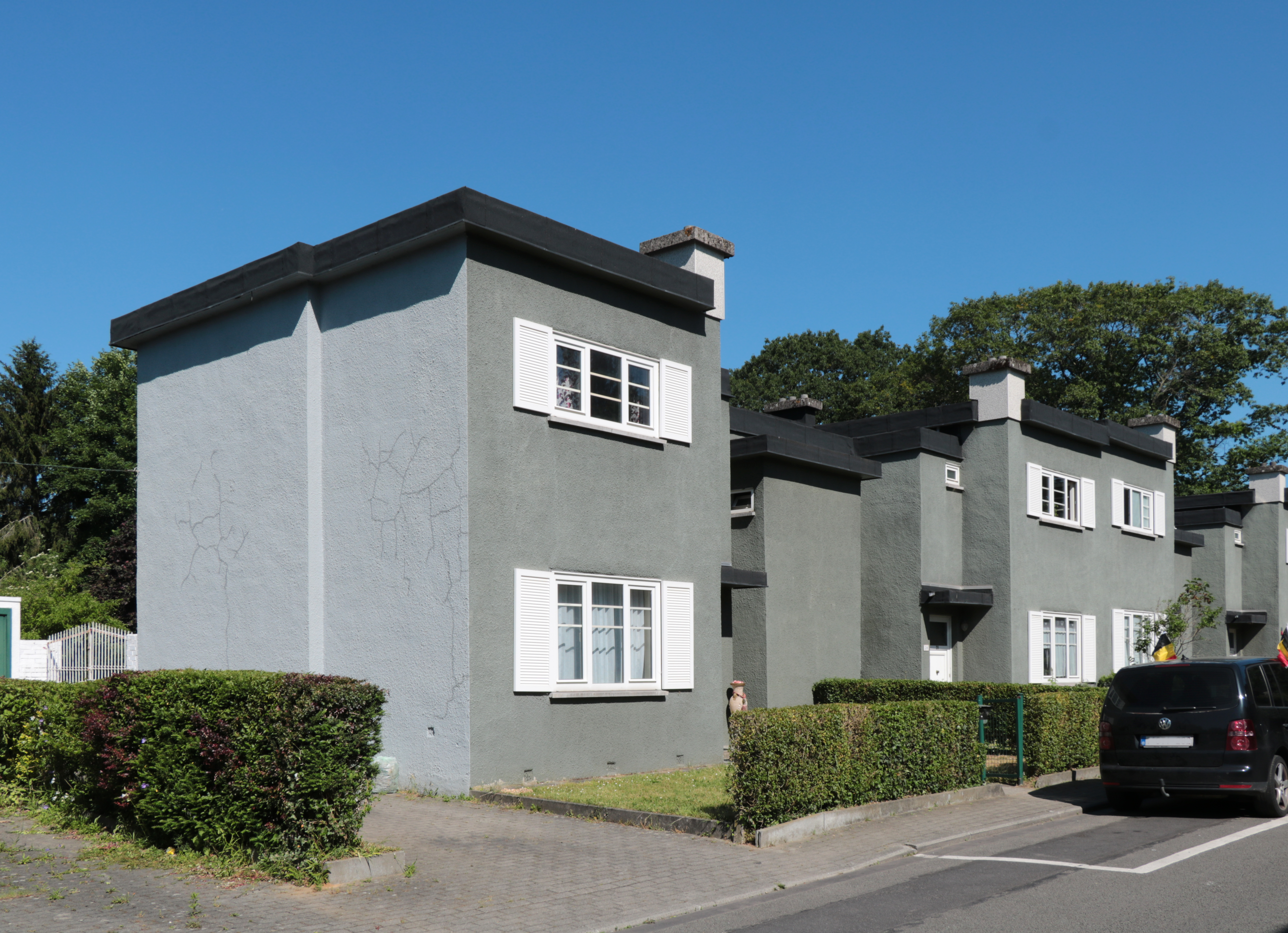
Kapelleveld garden city

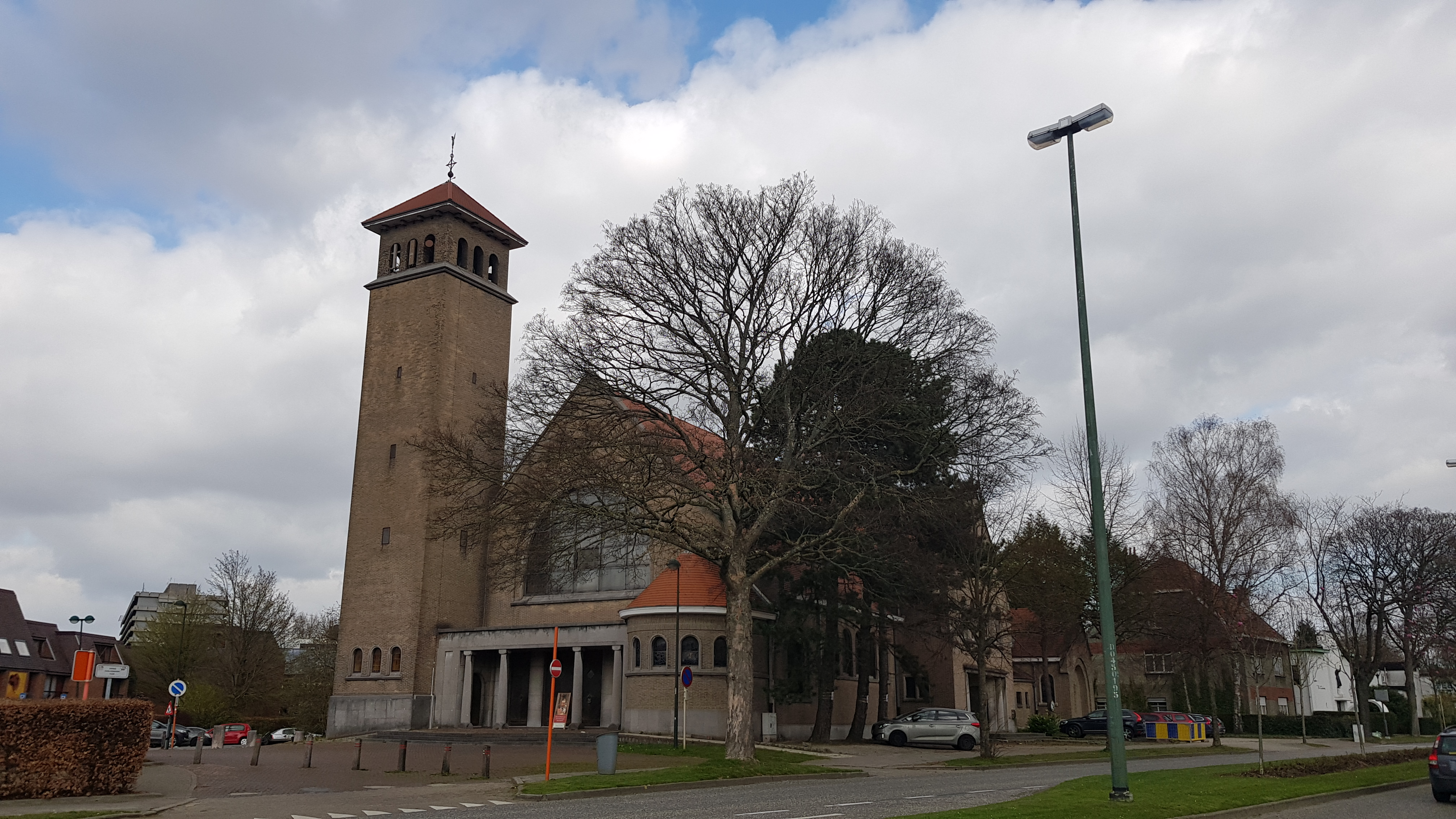
Church of Our Lady of the Assumption

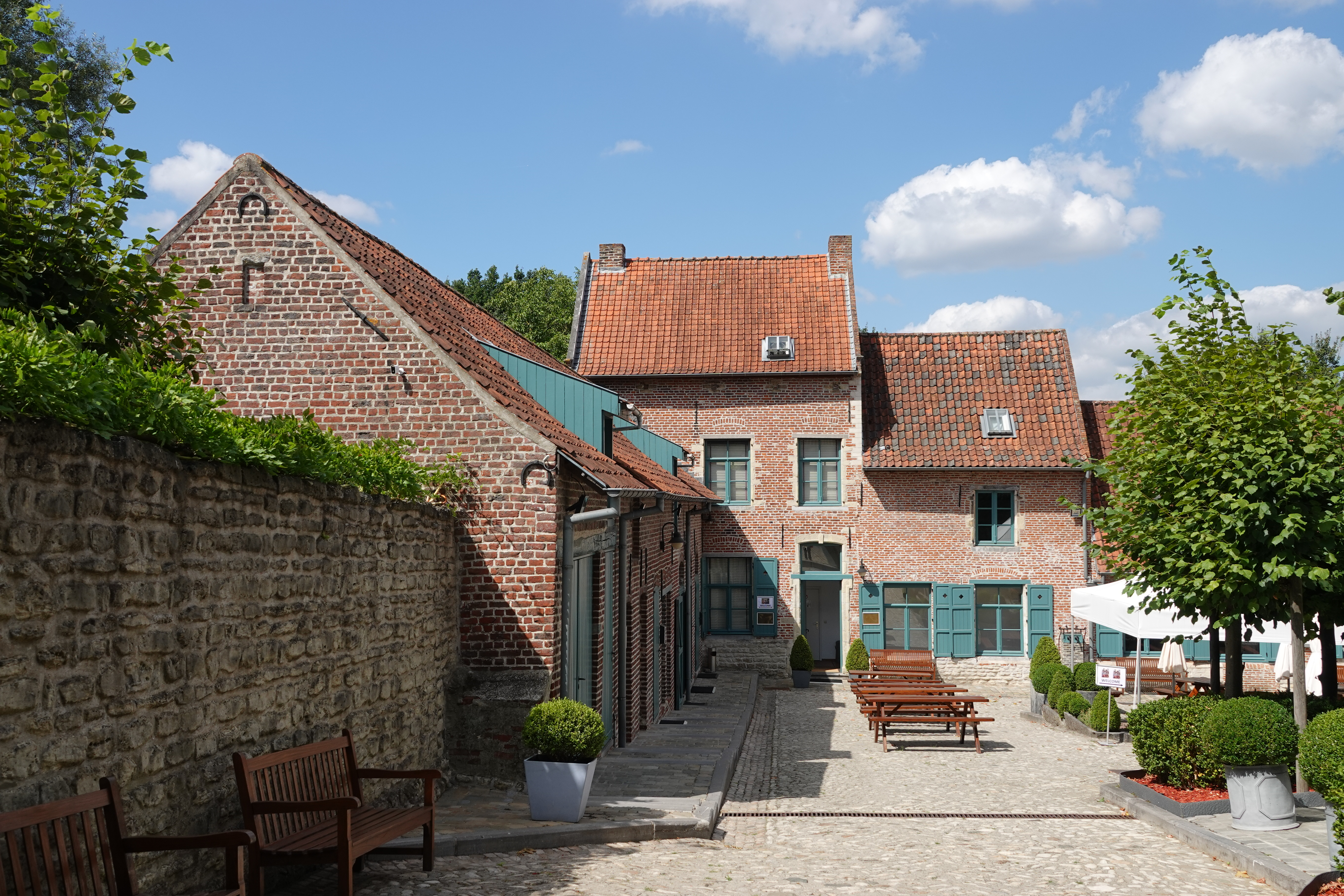
Hof ter Musschen

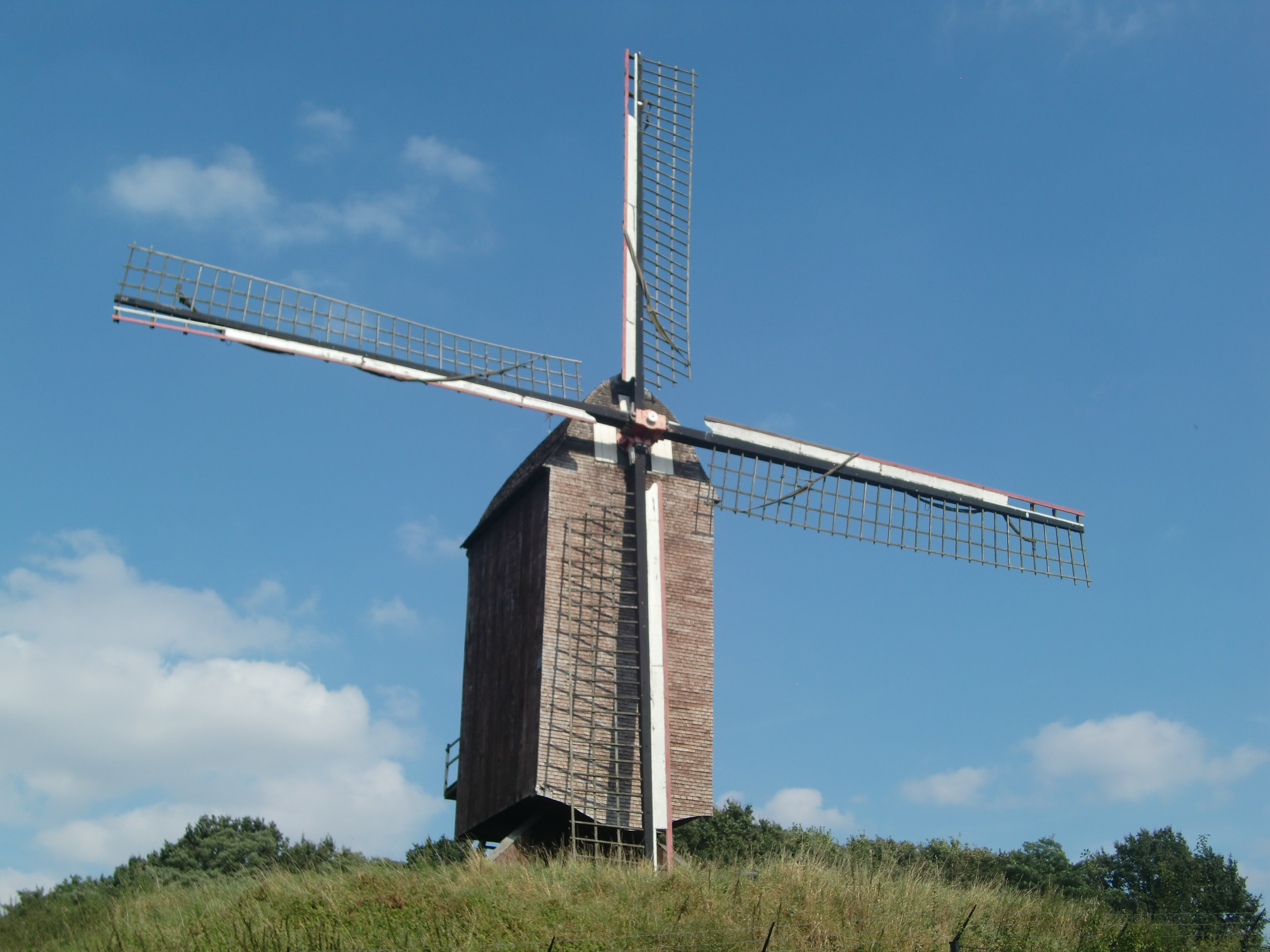
Burnt Mill

=== Woluwe-Saint-Pierre/Sint-Pieters-Woluwe ===
==== Historical centre ====
The historical centre of Woluwe-Saint-Pierre is the municipality's central district.

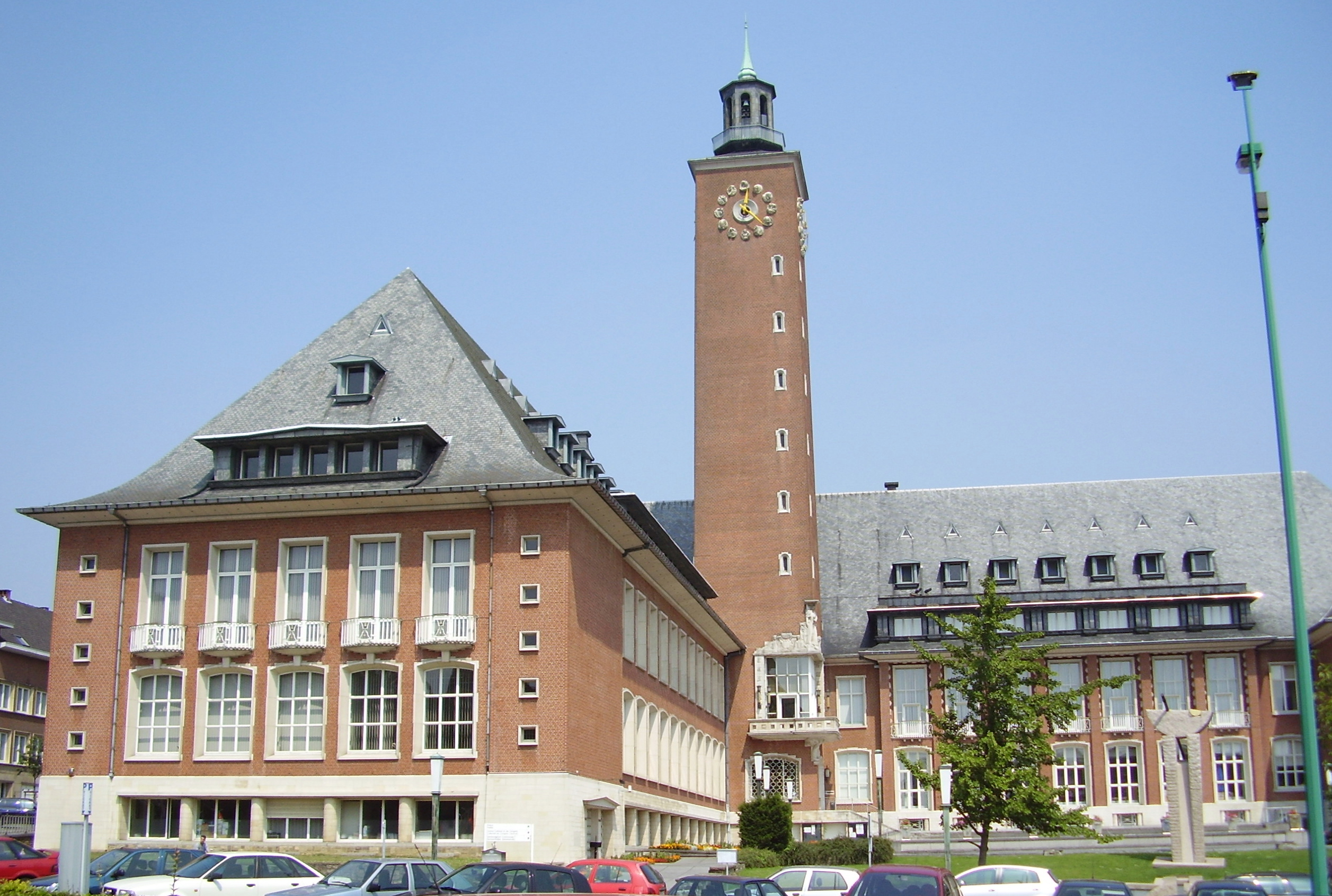
Woluwe-Saint-Pierre's Municipal Hall

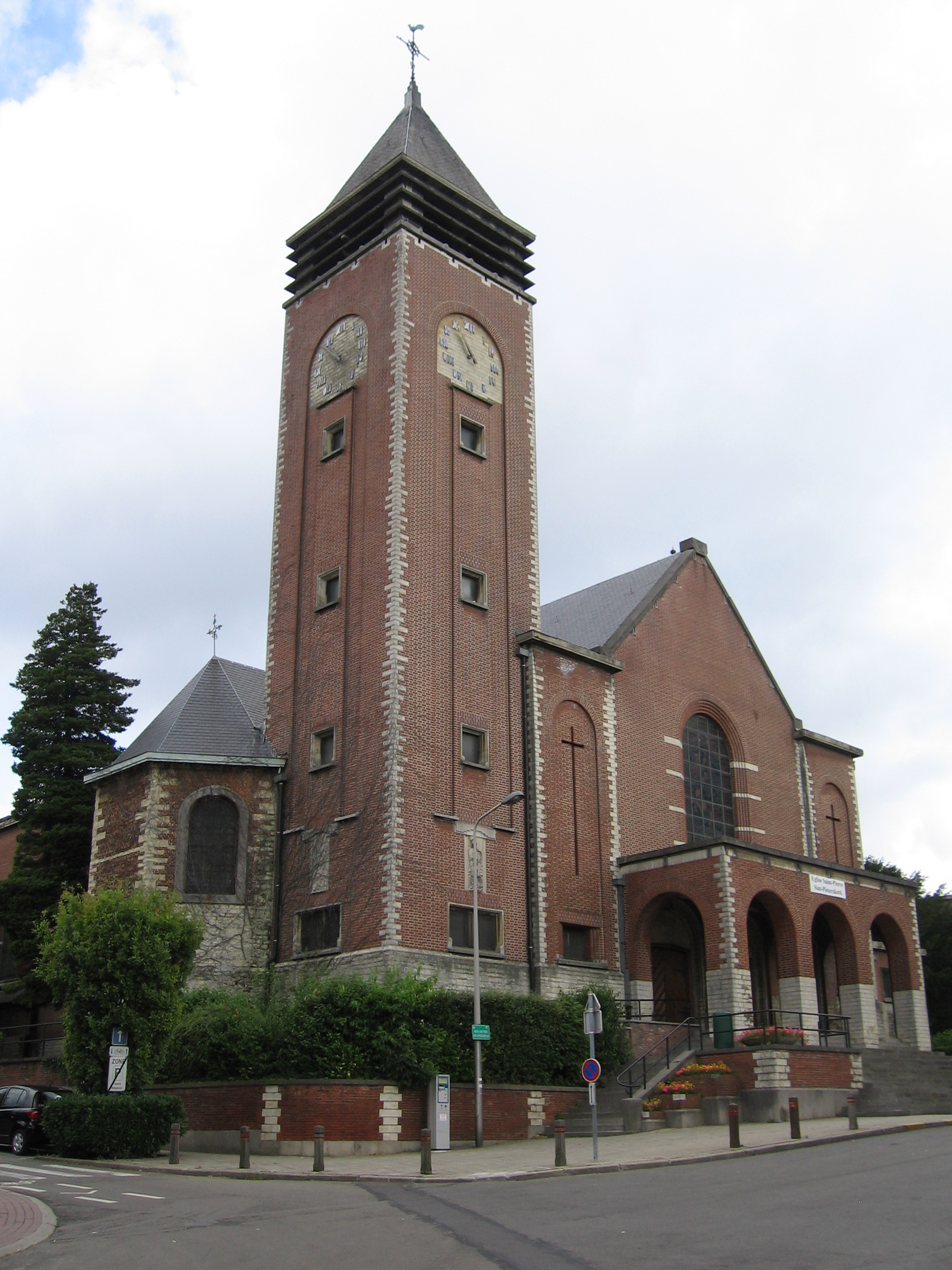
Church of St. Peter

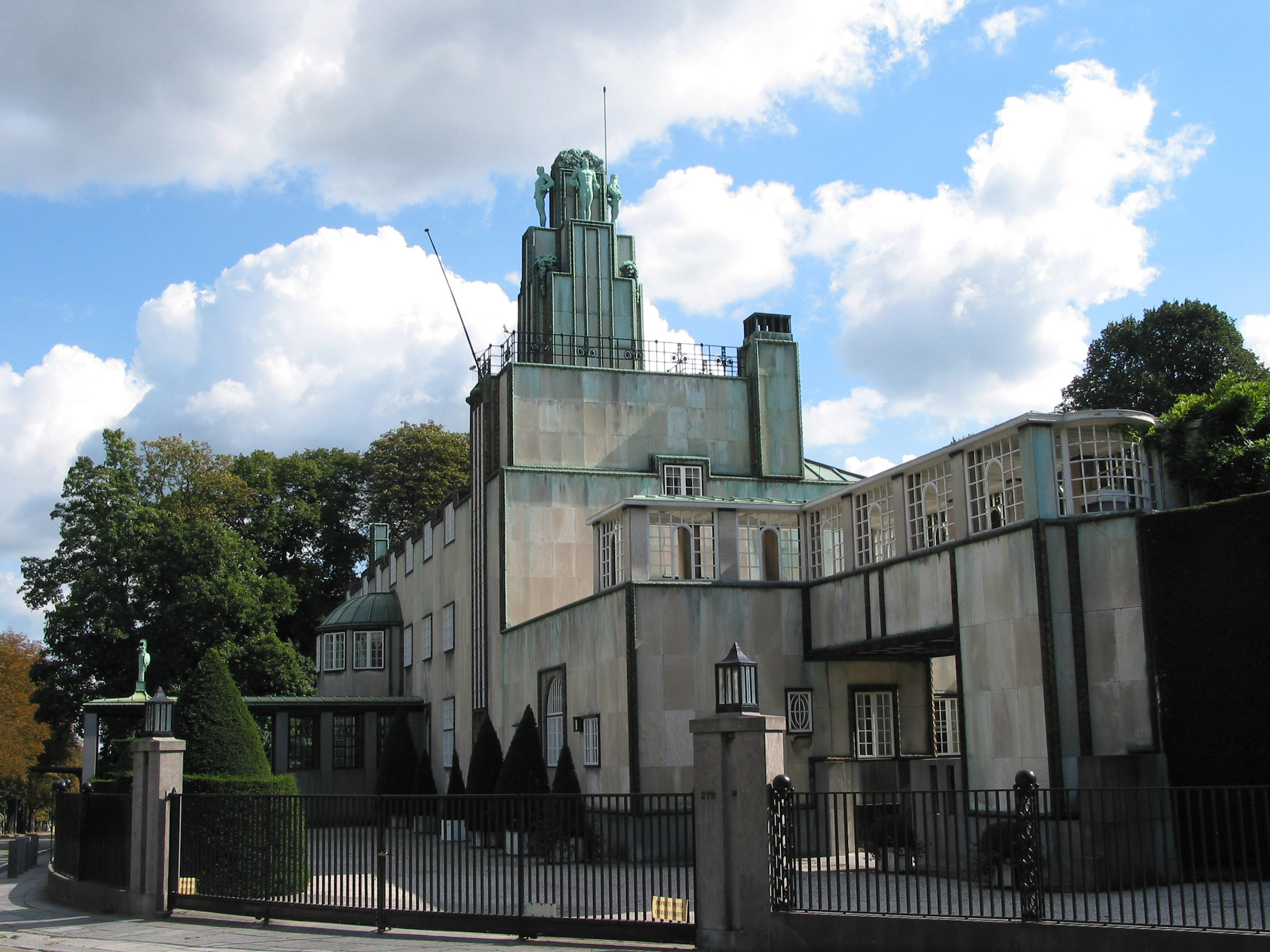
Stoclet Palace

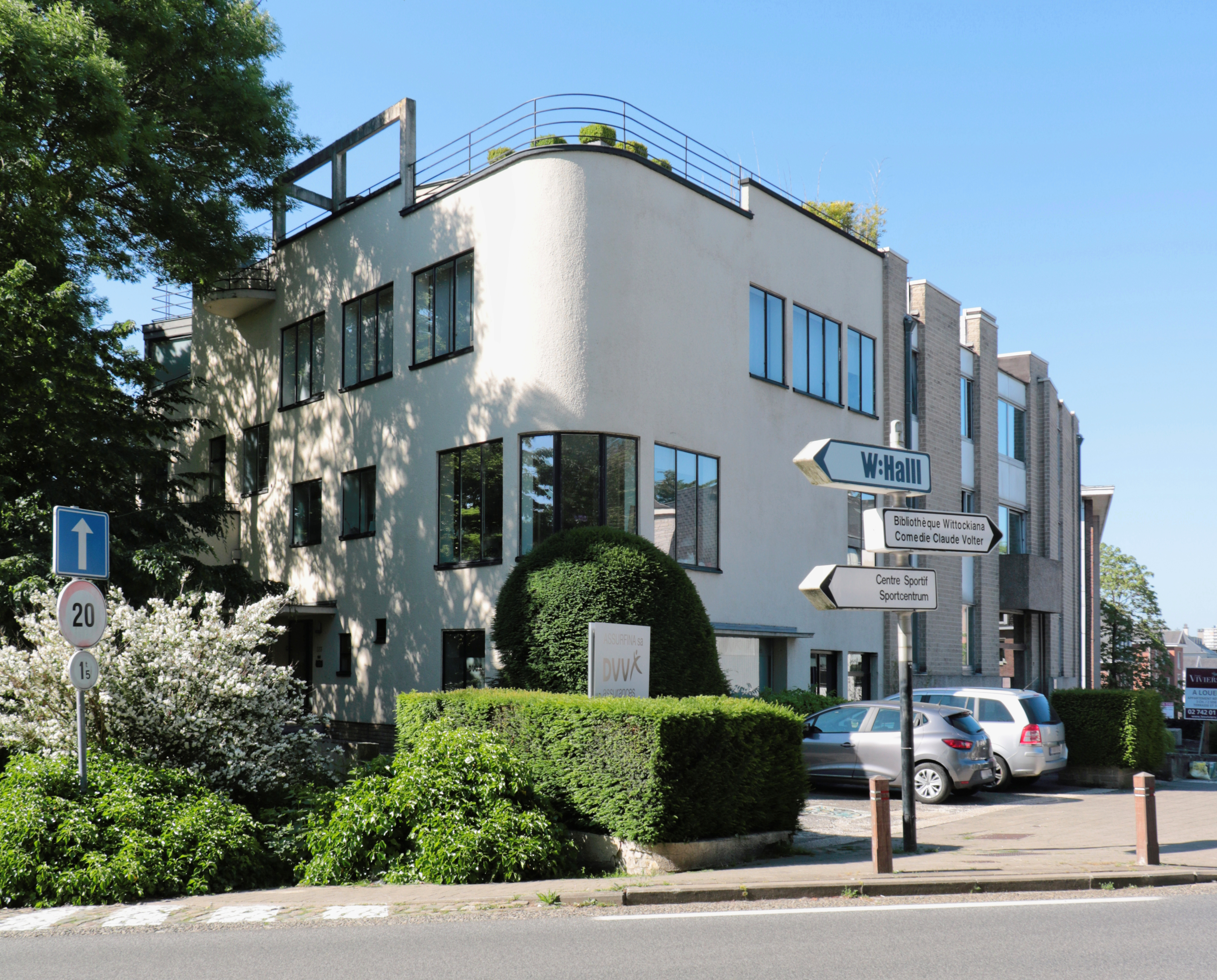
Gombert House

==== Chant d'Oiseau/Vogelzang ====
Located in the south-west of Woluwe-Saint-Pierre. The Avenue du Chant d'Oiseau/Vogelzanglaan runs through the district.

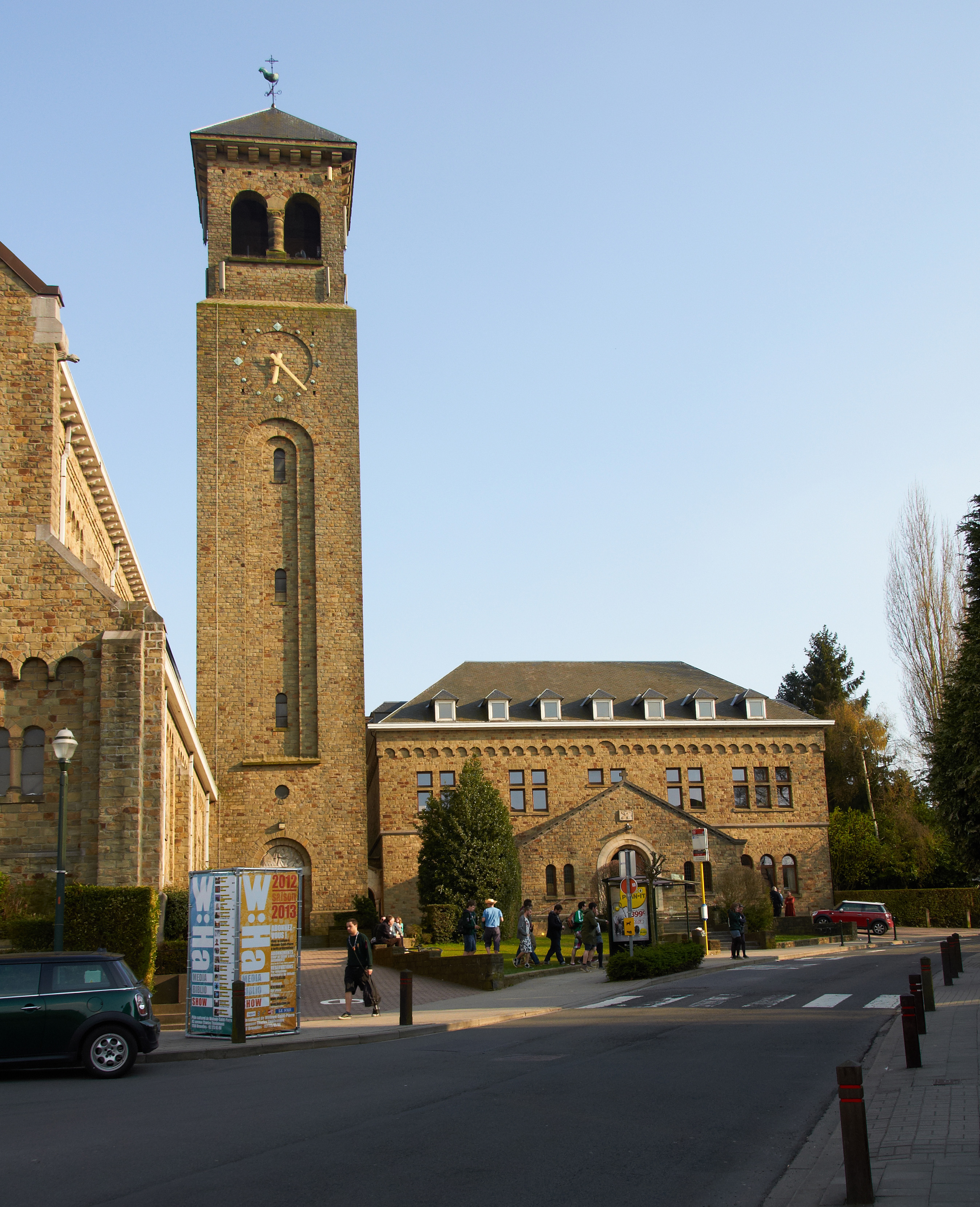
Church of Our Lady of Grace

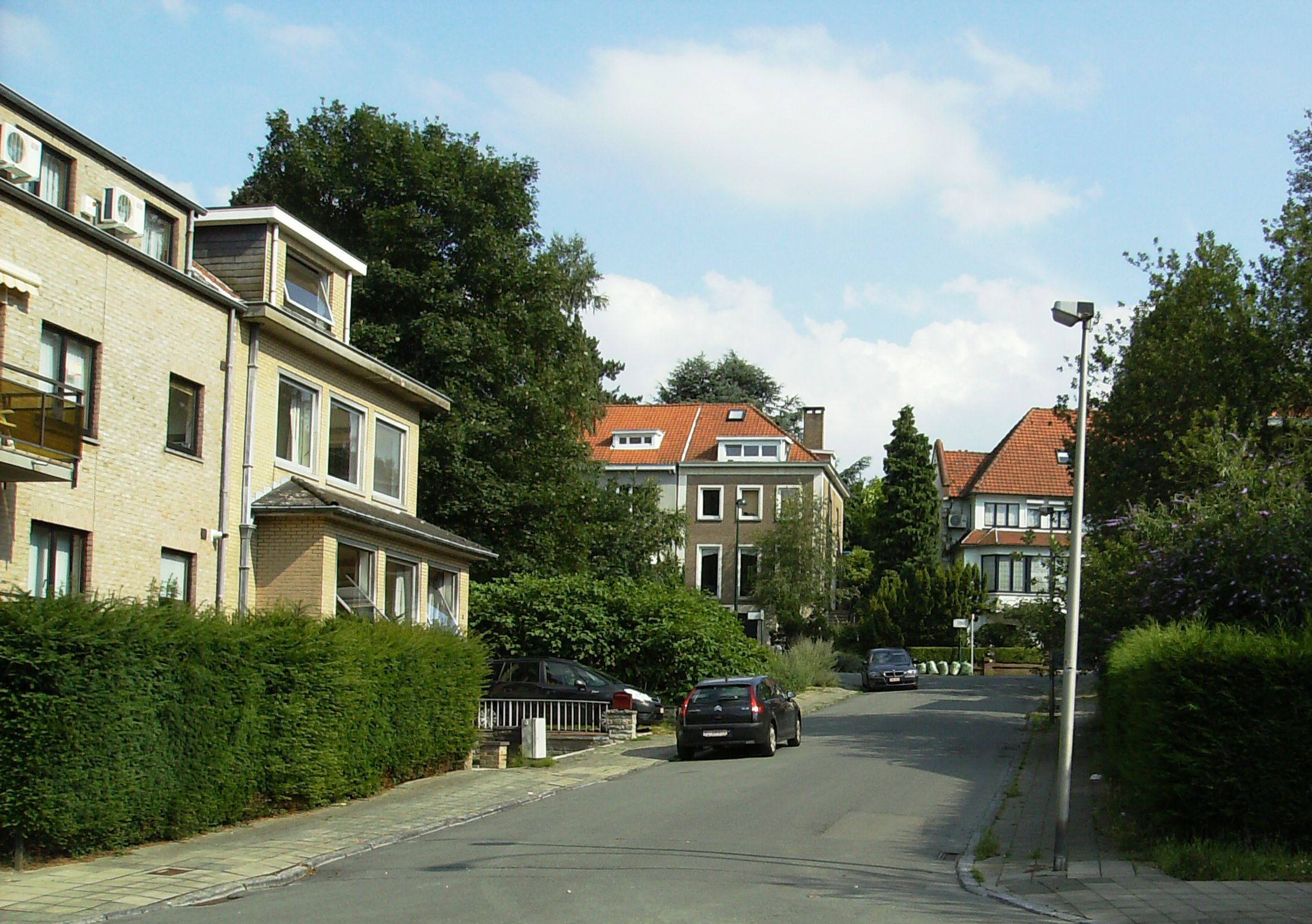
Avenue des Linottes/Vlasvinkenlaan

==== Stockel/Stokkel ====
Located in the north-east of Woluwe-Saint-Pierre. The Place Dumon/Dumonplein is the beating heart of the district. Most commercial activities take place on this oval-shaped square, including the weekly market. The neighbourhood also has its own shopping centre, Stockel Square, adjacent to the metro station.

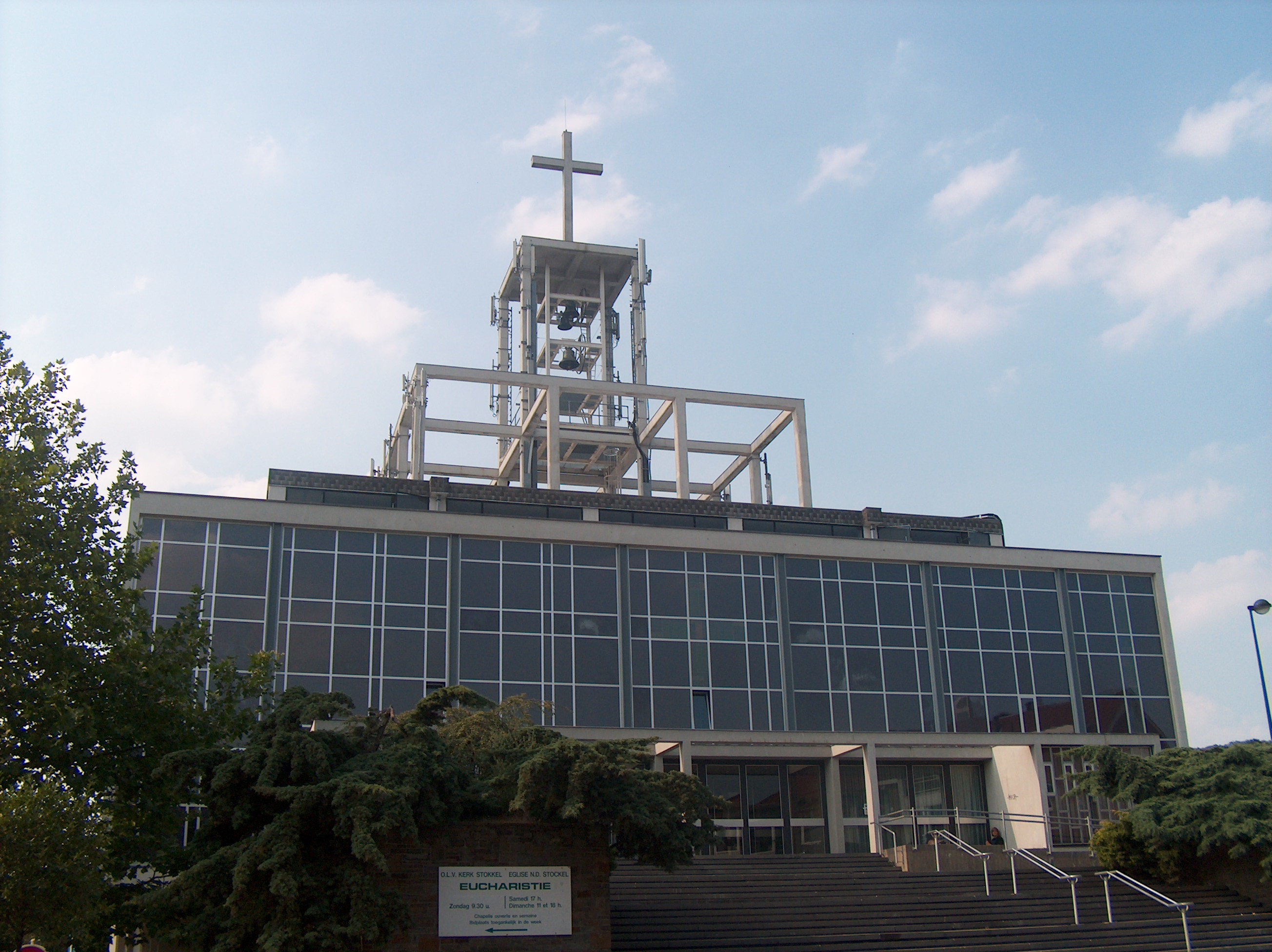
Church of Our Lady of Stockel

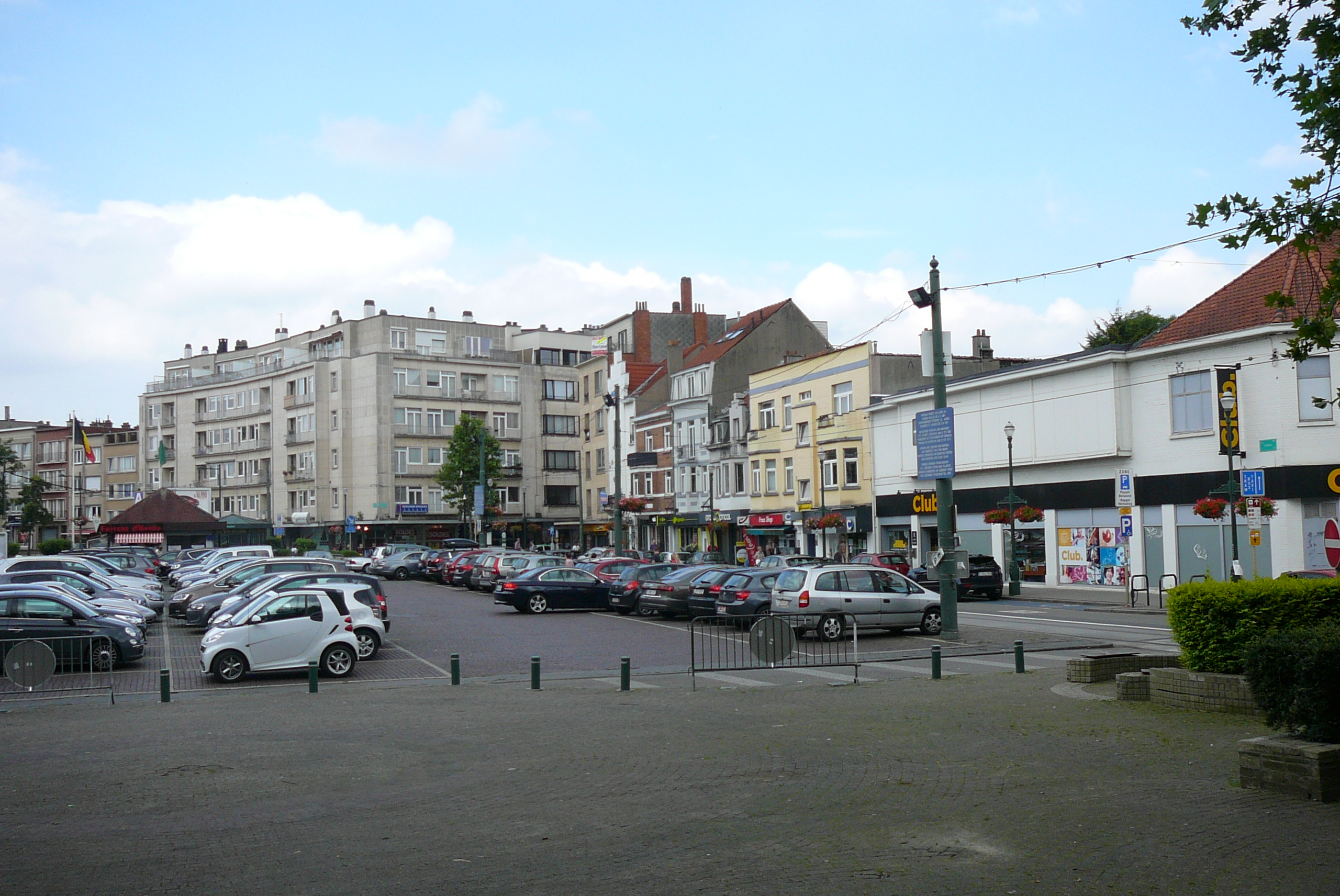
Place Dumon/Dumonplein

==== Joli-Bois/Mooi-Bos (Sainte-Alix/Sinte-Aleidis) ====
Located in the south-east of Woluwe-Saint-Pierre. To the south lies the Sonian Forest, to the east the southern spur of Kraainem, to the north the Stockel district, and to the west the Val Duchesse district. The Church of St. Alice is located in the heart of this district.

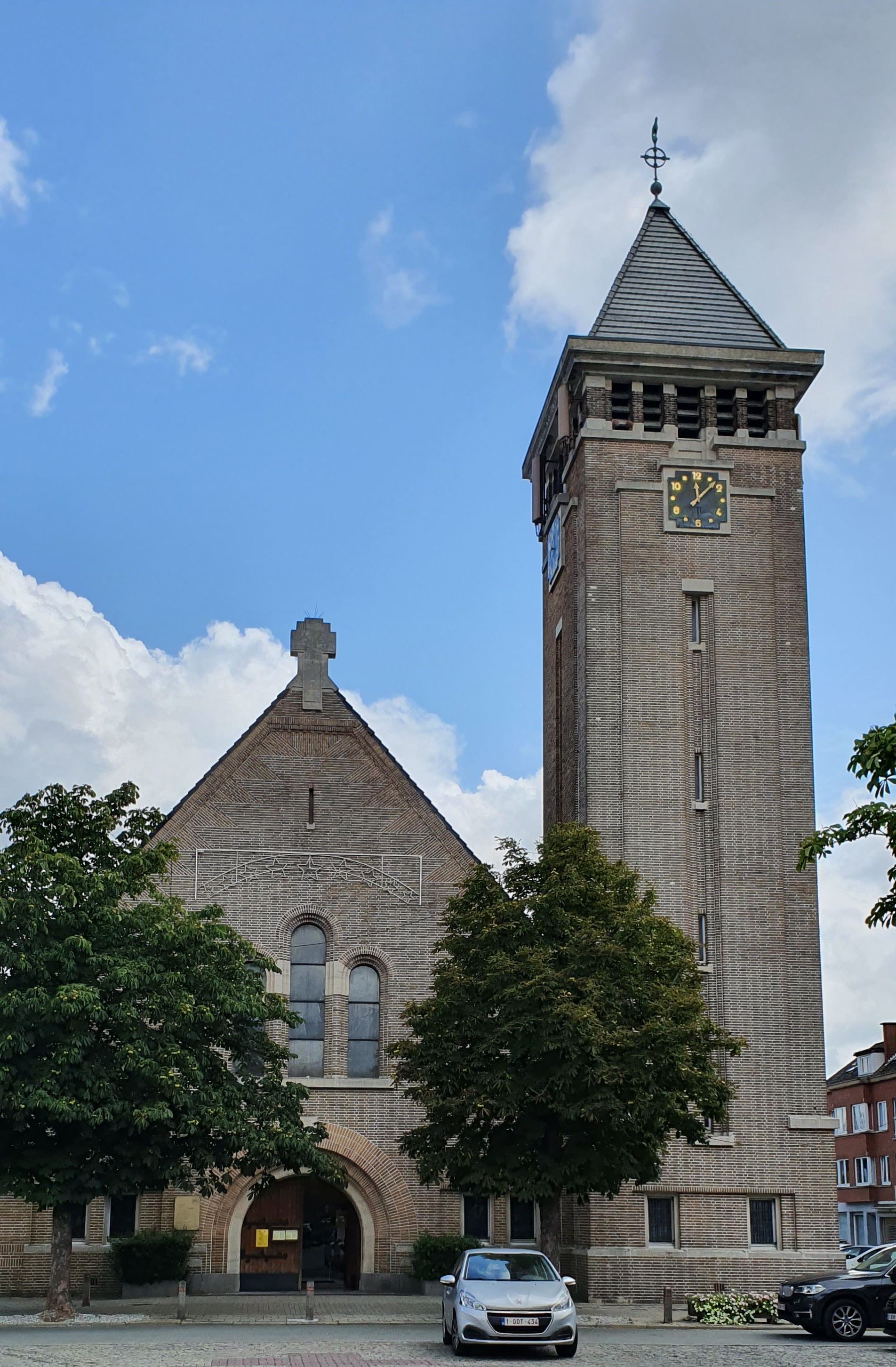
Church of St. Alice
